= Zoster vaccine =

Vaccine to prevent shingles

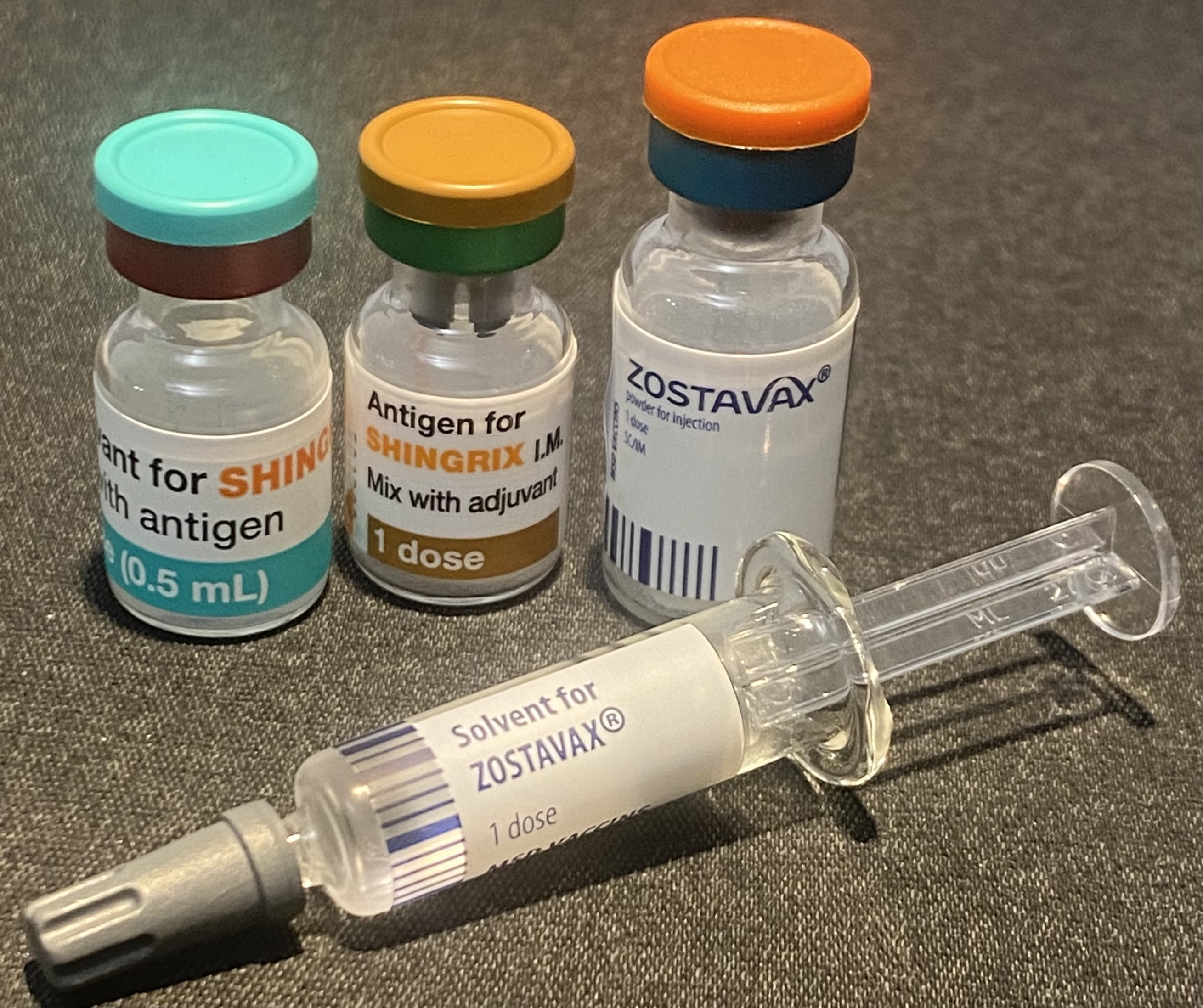

Vaccine description
- Target: Herpes zoster, postherpetic neuralgia, Ramsay Hunt syndrome type II
- Vaccine type: Zostavax: attenuated; Shingrix: recombinant protein subunit

Clinical data
- Trade names: Zostavax, Shingrix
- License data: US DailyMed: Zoster vaccine
- Pregnancy category: AU: B2
- Routes of administration: Zostavax: subcutaneous; Shingrix: intramuscular
- ATC code: J07BK02 (WHO) J07BK03 (WHO)

Legal status
- Legal status: AU: S4 (Prescription only); CA: ℞-only; UK: POM (Prescription only); US: ℞-only; EU: Rx-only; In general: ℞ (Prescription only)

Identifiers
- DrugBank: DB10318; DB13924
- ChemSpider: none
- UNII: GPV39ZGD8C; COB9FF6I46
- KEGG: D11562

A zoster vaccine is a vaccine that reduces the incidence of herpes zoster (a.k.a. shingles), a disease caused by later-life reactivation of the varicella zoster virus (the same virus responsible for chickenpox). Shingles provokes a painful rash with blisters, and can be followed by chronic pain (postherpetic neuralgia) and other complications. Older people are more often affected, as are people with weakened immune systems (those with immunosuppression). Both shingles and postherpetic neuralgia can be prevented by vaccination.

Two zoster vaccines have been approved for use in people over 50 years old. Shingrix (GSK) is a recombinant subunit vaccine that has been used in many countries since 2017. Zostavax (Merck), in use from 2006 until 2020, was an attenuated vaccine which consisted of a larger-than-normal dose of varicella vaccine. Unlike Shingrix, Zostavax is not suitable for people with immunosuppression or diseases that affect the immune system. Zostavax was discontinued in the United States in November 2020. Shingrix appears to prevent more cases of shingles than Zostavax, although side effects seem to be more frequent. Varicella vaccine is used to prevent diseases caused by the same virus.

== Medical uses ==
Zoster vaccination is used to prevent shingles and its complications, including postherpetic neuralgia. It can be considered a therapeutic vaccine, given that it is used to treat a latent virus that has remained dormant in cells since chicken pox infection earlier in life. The available zoster vaccine is intended for use in people over the age of 50. As of 2021 it was not confirmed whether a booster dose was required, but the Advisory Committee on Immunization Practices (ACIP) in the United States recommends Shingrix for adults over the age of 50, including those who have already received Zostavax.

=== Shingrix ===
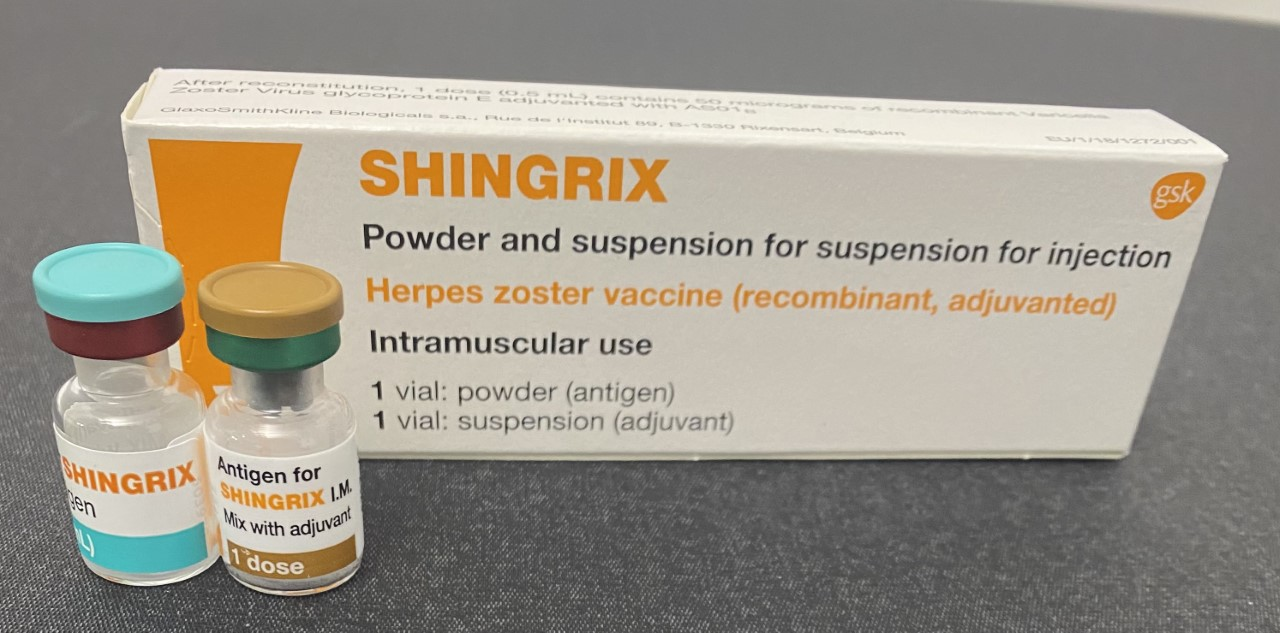
Shingrix

The ACIP voted that Shingrix is preferred over Zostavax for the prevention of zoster and related complications because data showed vaccine efficacy of more than 90% against shingles across all age groups. Unlike Zostavax, which is given as a single shot, Shingrix is given as two identical intramuscular doses, two to six months apart. Shingrix provides high levels of immunity for at least 7 years after vaccination, but it is possible the vaccine may provide protection for much longer.

A large randomized clinical trial showed Shingrix reduced the incidence of shingles 96.6% (relative risk reduction, RRR) in the 50–59 age group, and 91.3% (relative risk reduction, RRR) in those over age 70. The absolute decrease in risk (absolute risk reduction, ARR) of herpes zoster following immunization over three and a half years is 3.3% (3.54% down to 0.28%) while the decrease in the risk of postherpetic neuralgia is 0.3% (0.34% down to 0.06%).

=== Zostavax ===
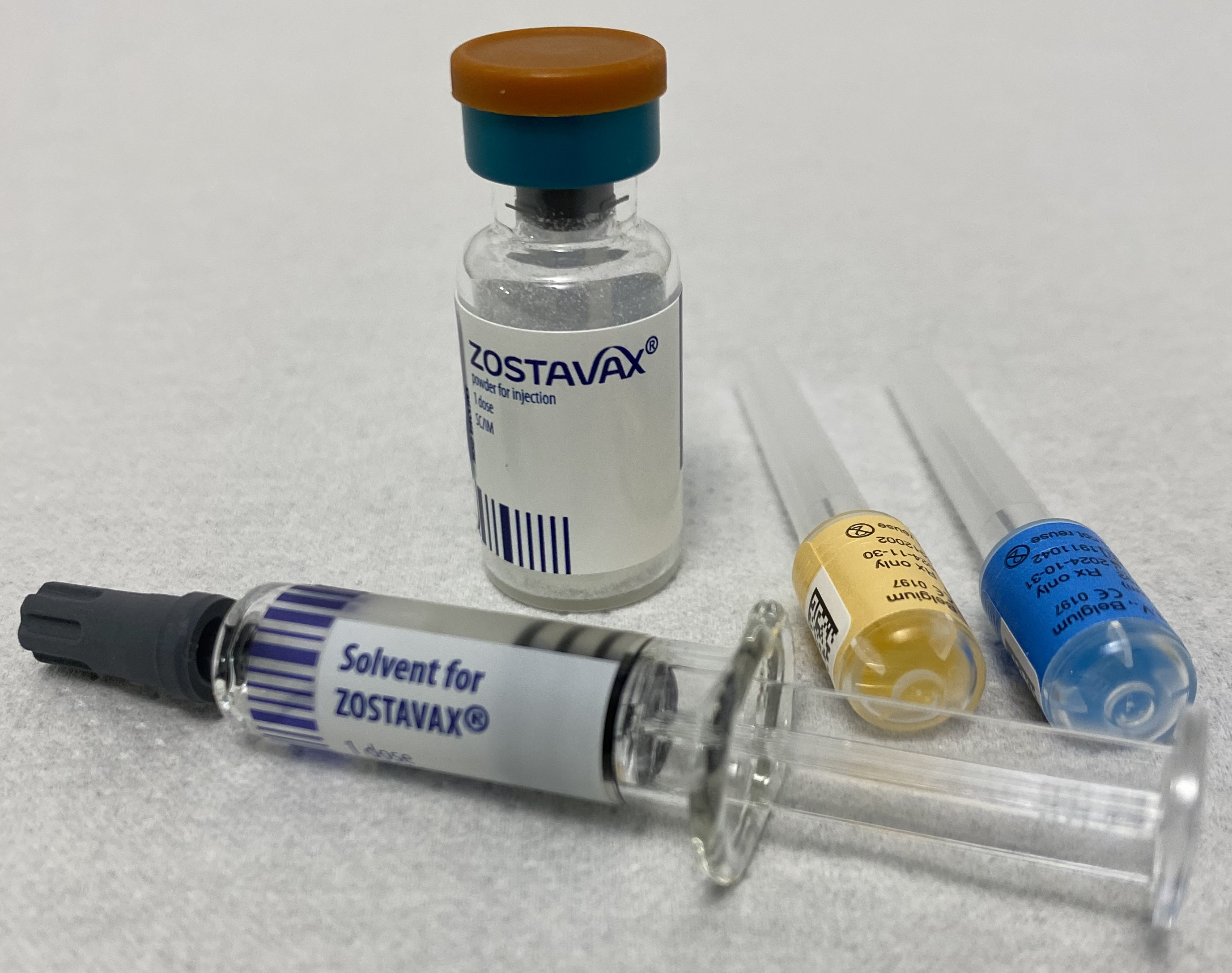
Zostavax vaccine

The Zostavax vaccine (both single dose and two-dose regime) is likely effective at protecting people from herpes zoster disease for a duration of up to three years. The degree of longer term protection (beyond 4 years from the initial vaccination) is not clear. The need for re-vaccination after the first full vaccine schedule is complete remains to be confirmed.

Zostavax was shown to reduce the incidence of shingles by 51% in a study of 38,000 adults aged 60 and older who received the vaccine. The vaccine also reduced by 67% the number of cases of postherpetic neuralgia (PHN) and reduced the severity and duration of pain and discomfort associated with shingles, by 61%. The FDA originally recommended it for individuals 60 years of age or older who are not severely allergic to any of its components and who meet the following requirements:

- do not have a weakened immune system due to HIV/AIDS or another disease or medications (such as steroids, radiation and chemotherapy) that affect the immune system;
- do not have a history of cancer affecting the bone marrow or lymphatic system, such as leukemia or lymphoma; and
- do not have active, untreated tuberculosis.

In 2006, the US Advisory Committee on Immunization Practices (ACIP) recommended that the live vaccine be given to all adults age 60 and over, including those who have had a previous episode of shingles, and those who do not recall having had chickenpox, since more than 99% of Americans ages 40 and older have had chickenpox.

== Side effects ==
=== Shingrix ===
Temporary side effects from the Shingrix shots are likely and can be severe enough in one out of six people to affect normal daily activities for up to three days. Mild to moderate pain at the injection site is common, and some may have redness or swelling. Side effects include fatigue, muscle pain, headache, shivering, fever, and nausea. Symptoms usually resolve in two to three days. Side effects with Shingrix are greater than those with Zostavax and occur more frequently in individuals aged 50 to 69 years compared with those 70 years and older.

=== Zostavax ===
The live vaccine (Zostavax) is very safe; one to a few percent of people develop a mild form of chickenpox, often with about five or six blisters around the injection site, and without fever. The blisters are harmless and temporary. In one study 64% of the Zostavax group and 14% of the controls had some adverse reaction. However, the rates of serious adverse events were comparable between the Zostavax group (0.6%) and those receiving the placebo (0.5%). A study including children with leukaemia found that the risk of getting shingles after vaccination is much lower than the risk of getting shingles for children with natural chicken pox in their history. Data from healthy children and adults point in the same direction.

Zostavax is not used in people with compromised immune function.

== Composition ==
=== Shingrix ===
Shingrix is a suspension for intramuscular injection consisting of a lyophilized recombinant varicella zoster virus glycoprotein E antigen that is reconstituted at the time of use with AS01_{B} suspension as an immunological adjuvant. The antigen is a purified truncated form of the glycoprotein, expressed in Chinese hamster ovary cells. The AS01_{B} adjuvant suspension is composed of 3-O-desacyl-4'-monophosphoryl lipid A (MPL) from Salmonella (Minnesota strain) and a saponin molecule (QS-21) purified from Quillaja saponaria (soap bark tree) extract, combined in a liposomal formulation consisting of dioleoyl phosphatidylcholine (DOPC) and cholesterol in phosphate-buffered saline solution.

=== Zostavax ===
Zostavax contains live attenuated varicella-zoster virus. It is injected subcutaneously (under the skin) in the upper arm. The live vaccine is produced using the MRC-5 line of fetal cells. This has raised religious and ethical concerns for some potential users, since that cell line was derived from an aborted fetus.

== Cost effectiveness ==
A 2007 study found that the live vaccine is likely to be cost-effective in the US, projecting an annual savings of US$82 to US$103 million in healthcare costs with cost-effectiveness ratios ranging from US$16,229 to US$27,609 per quality-adjusted life year gained. In 2007, the live vaccine was officially recommended in the US for healthy adults aged 60 and over, but is no longer given out in the United States as of 2020, given the superiority of Shingrix.

In Canada the cost of Shingrix is about CA$300 for the two doses. This likely represents a more cost effective intervention than the live vaccine given its lower cost and increased effectiveness.

== History ==
=== European Union ===
In 2006, the European Medicines Agency (EMA) issued a marketing authorization for the zoster vaccine to Sanofi Pasteur for routine vaccination in individuals aged 60 and over. In 2007, the EMA updated the marketing authorization for routine vaccination in individuals aged 50 and over.

Shingrix was approved for medical use in the European Union in March 2018, with an indication for the prevention of herpes zoster (HZ) and post-herpetic neuralgia (PHN) in adults 50 years of age or older.

=== United Kingdom ===
From 2013, the UK National Health Service (NHS) started offering shingles vaccination to elderly people. People aged either 70 or 79 on 1 September 2013, were offered the vaccine. People aged 71 to 78 on that date would only have an opportunity to have the shingles vaccine after reaching the age of 79. The original intention was for people aged between 70 and 79 to be vaccinated, but the NHS later said that the vaccination program was being staggered as it would be impractical to vaccinate everyone in their 70s in a single year.

In 2021, vaccination against shingles is available on the NHS to people aged 70 to 79. Vaccination is with single-dose Zostavax, except for people for whom Zostavax is deemed unsuitable, for example, with a condition that affects the immune system, for whom two-dose Shingrix vaccine is recommended. The NHS stated "The shingles vaccine is not available on the NHS to anyone aged 80 or over because it seems to be less effective in this age group". Since 2023, the shingles vaccines is being offered to healthy people turning 65.

=== United States ===
Zostavax was developed by Merck & Co. and approved and licensed by the US Food and Drug Administration (FDA) in May 2006, In 2011, the FDA approved the live vaccine for use in individuals 50 to 59 years of age. Shingrix is a zoster vaccine developed by GlaxoSmithKline that was approved in the United States in October 2017. Shingrix, which provides strong protection against shingles and PHN, was preferred over Zostavax before Zostavax was discontinued.

In June 2020, Merck discontinued the sale of Zostavax in the US. Vaccine doses already held by practitioners could still be administered up to the expiration date (none expired later than November 2020).

The US Centers for Disease Control and Prevention (CDC) recommends that healthy adults 50 years and older get two doses of Shingrix, at least two months apart. Initial clinical trials only tested a gap of less than six months between doses, but unexpected popularity and resulting shortages caused further testing to validate wider spacing of the two doses. Adults 19 years and older who are immunocompromised because of disease or therapy are also recommended to receive two doses of Shingrix.

The zoster vaccine is covered by Medicare Part D. In 2019, more than 90% of Medicare Part D vaccine spending was for the zoster vaccine. 5.8 million vaccine doses were administered to Part D beneficiaries that year at a cost of $857 million.
