= Evelyn Nicol =

American immunologist and microbiologist

Evelyn Marie Carmon Nicol
- Born: June 2, 1930; Little Rock, Kentucky, U.S.
- Died: May 27, 2020 (aged 89); Weston, Connecticut, U.S.
- Education: Tuskegee University
- Known for: Isolation of the herpes zoster (shingles) virus
- Children: 3
- Scientific career
- Fields: Immunology, microbiology
- Workplaces: Carver Research Foundation; Cleveland City Hospital; Rand Development Corporation; University of Kansas Medical Center; Michael Reese Hospital; Abbott Laboratories; Baxter Pharmaceuticals
- Academic advisors: Russel Brown; Frederick C. Robbins; John F. Enders

Evelyn Marie Carmon Nicol (June 2, 1930 – May 27, 2020) was an American immunologist and microbiologist. She was the first scientist to isolate the herpes zoster virus, and is one of the few African American women to receive a patent in molecular biology, for a new production method of urokinase.

== Early life and education ==
Nicol was born in Little Rock, Kentucky. Her parents were Daniel Eugene Carmon, a schoolteacher, and Margarite Wilson Carmon, a homemaker. She was 8th of 11 children. In an interview for Lifeology, Nicol explained that despite her family having very little: "we used to have a lot of fun. You couldn't grow up any better than that." As their local school was underfunded, and only went up to the eighth grade, Nicol's father took it upon himself to give the children extra homeschooling.

During her high school years, Nicol worked as a domestic to earn money. When she graduated from high school, Nicol was offered a scholarship at Tuskegee University to study Home Economics. She moved to Alabama in 1949 to attend university, but she chose to study Mathematics and Chemistry instead of Home Economics. She funded her studies by working two jobs. Nicol graduated at the top of her class in 1953 with a degree in Chemistry and Mathematics, and earned the Beta Kappa Chi and Alpha Kappa Mu honors.

== Research and career ==
From 1953 to 1955, Nicol worked as a research assistant for the Salk Polio Project of the Carver Research Foundation. Under the supervision of Dr. Russel W. Brown, she worked on developing the first polio vaccine using HeLa cell cultures. Nicol then joined the Cleveland City Hospital, working with Frederick C. Robbins and John F. Enders. There, she was the first person to successfully isolate the herpes zoster virus, which causes shingles, using amniotic cells in tissue culture. In an interview for Lifeology, Nicol said: "Things just come to me. I don't know why. It just seems like common sense."

Following these her early career successes, Nicol was recruited by Rand Development Corporation, where she worked on isolating the leukemia agent. During this time, Nicol also worked for the University of Kansas Medical Centre, and the Michael Reese Hospital.

Nicol then joined Abbott Laboratories as a research assistant in 1962. There, she faced discrimination from her white colleagues, who would take credit for results and sabotage her work. On 6 January 1976, Nicol patented a new technique to increase the production yield of urokinase (U.S. Patent No. 3,930,944), an enzyme used to dissolve blood clots. She was one of the few African American women to be awarded a patent in molecular biology at that time. Among her many achievements while working at Abbott, Nicol successfully developed a test for toxoplasmosis in pregnant women, and an interferon assay.

In 1985, Nicol was recruited by Baxter Pharmaceuticals. Within their hepatitis research and development group, known as Pandex, Nicol led the retrovirology division, which produced testing kits for blood-borne diseases such as HIV and human T-cell lymphotropic virus. Two blind studies funded by Abbott Pharmaceuticals determined that the testing kits produced under Nicol's leadership were the best available. While at Baxter pharmaceuticals, Nicol used her seniority to combat workplace discrimination, and advocate for fairer hiring practices. For example, she hired Linda Smith, whose resume had initially been rejected, likely because she had studied at a historically Black university.

While she was working there, Pandex was bought by Nicol's former employer Abbott Laboratories. Nicol retired in 1990, refusing to work for a company that had been so openly discriminatory.

== Personal life ==
Nicol had three children. Upon retirement, she lived in Waukegan, Illinois, and later in Weston, Connecticut. Retirement allowed Evelyn to partake in her many hobbies such as oil painting, bridge, and tennis to name a few. At the age of 89, Nicol was hospitalized for a stroke, and was diagnosed with COVID-19. She died from complications of the virus in May 2020.
