= Shingles =

Viral disease caused by the varicella zoster virus

- Other names: Herpes zoster
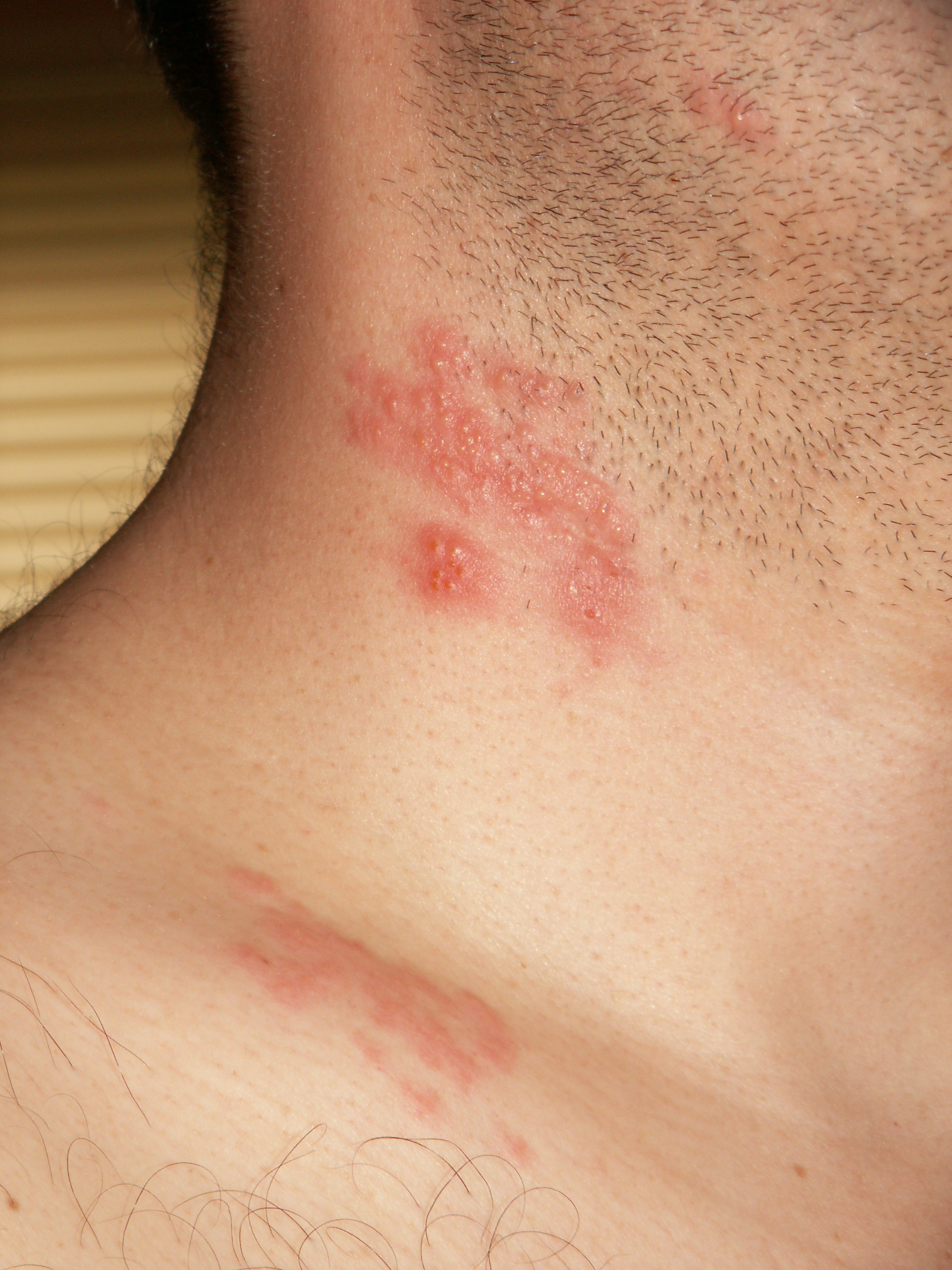
- Herpes zoster blisters on the neck and shoulder
- Specialty: Dermatology
- Symptoms: Painful rash
- Complications: Meningitis, facial nerve palsy, keratitis, postherpetic neuralgia
- Duration: 2–4 weeks
- Causes: Varicella zoster virus (VZV)
- Risk factors: Old age, poor immune function, having had chickenpox before 18 months of age
- Diagnostic method: Based on symptoms
- Differential diagnosis: Herpes simplex, chest pain, insect bites, cutaneous leishmaniasis
- Prevention: Shingles vaccine, chickenpox vaccine (before the child gets chickenpox)
- Medication: Aciclovir (if given early), pain medication
- Frequency: 33% (at some point)
- Deaths: 6,400 per year (including chickenpox deaths)

Shingles, also known as herpes zoster or zona, is a viral disease characterized by a painful skin rash with blisters in a localized area. Typically the rash occurs in a single, wide mark either on the left or right side of the body or face. Two to four days before the rash occurs, there may be tingling or local pain in the area. Other common symptoms are fever, headache, and tiredness. The rash usually heals within four weeks, but some people develop ongoing nerve pain which can last for months or years, a condition called postherpetic neuralgia (PHN). In those with poor immune function the rash may occur widely. If the rash involves the eye, vision loss may occur.

Shingles is caused by the varicella zoster virus (VZV) that also causes chickenpox. In the case of chickenpox, also called varicella, the initial infection with the virus typically occurs during childhood or adolescence. Once the chickenpox has resolved, the virus can remain dormant (inactive) in human nerve cells (dorsal root ganglia or cranial nerves) for years or decades, after which it may reactivate and travel along nerve bodies to nerve endings in the skin, producing blisters. During an outbreak of shingles, exposure to the varicella virus found in shingles blisters can cause chickenpox in someone who has not yet had chickenpox, although that person will not develop shingles, at least on the first infection. How the virus subsequently re-activates is not well understood.

The disease has been recognized since ancient times. Risk factors for reactivation of the dormant virus include old age, poor immune function, and having contracted chickenpox before 18 months of age. Diagnosis is typically based on the signs and symptoms presented. Varicella zoster virus is not the same as herpes simplex virus, although they both belong to the alpha subfamily of herpesviruses.

Shingles vaccines reduce the risk of shingles by 50–90%, depending on the vaccine used. Vaccination also decreases rates of postherpetic neuralgia, and, if shingles occurs, its severity. If shingles develops, antiviral medications such as aciclovir can reduce the severity and duration of disease if started within 72 hours of the appearance of the rash. Evidence does not show a significant effect of antivirals or steroids on rates of postherpetic neuralgia. Paracetamol, NSAIDs, or opioids may be used to help with acute pain.

It is estimated that about a third of people develop shingles at some point in their lives. While shingles is more common among older people, children may also get the disease. According to the US National Institutes of Health, the number of new cases per year ranges from 1.2 to 3.4 per 1,000 person-years among healthy individuals to 3.9 to 11.8 per 1,000 person-years among those older than 65 years of age. About half of those living to age 85 will have at least one attack, and fewer than 5% will have more than one attack. Although symptoms can be severe, risk of death is extremely low: 0.28 to 0.69 deaths per million.

== Signs and symptoms ==
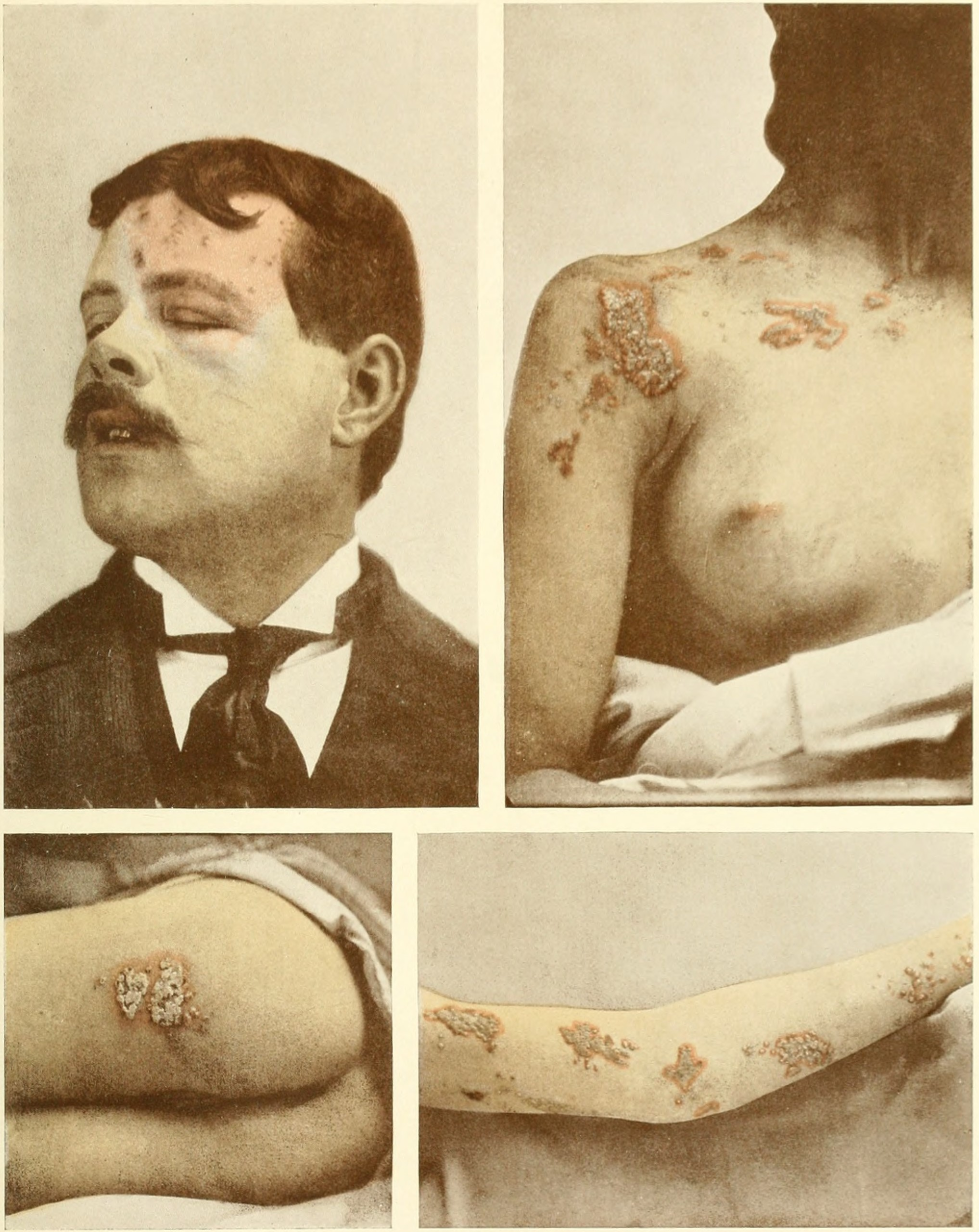
Shingles in various locations

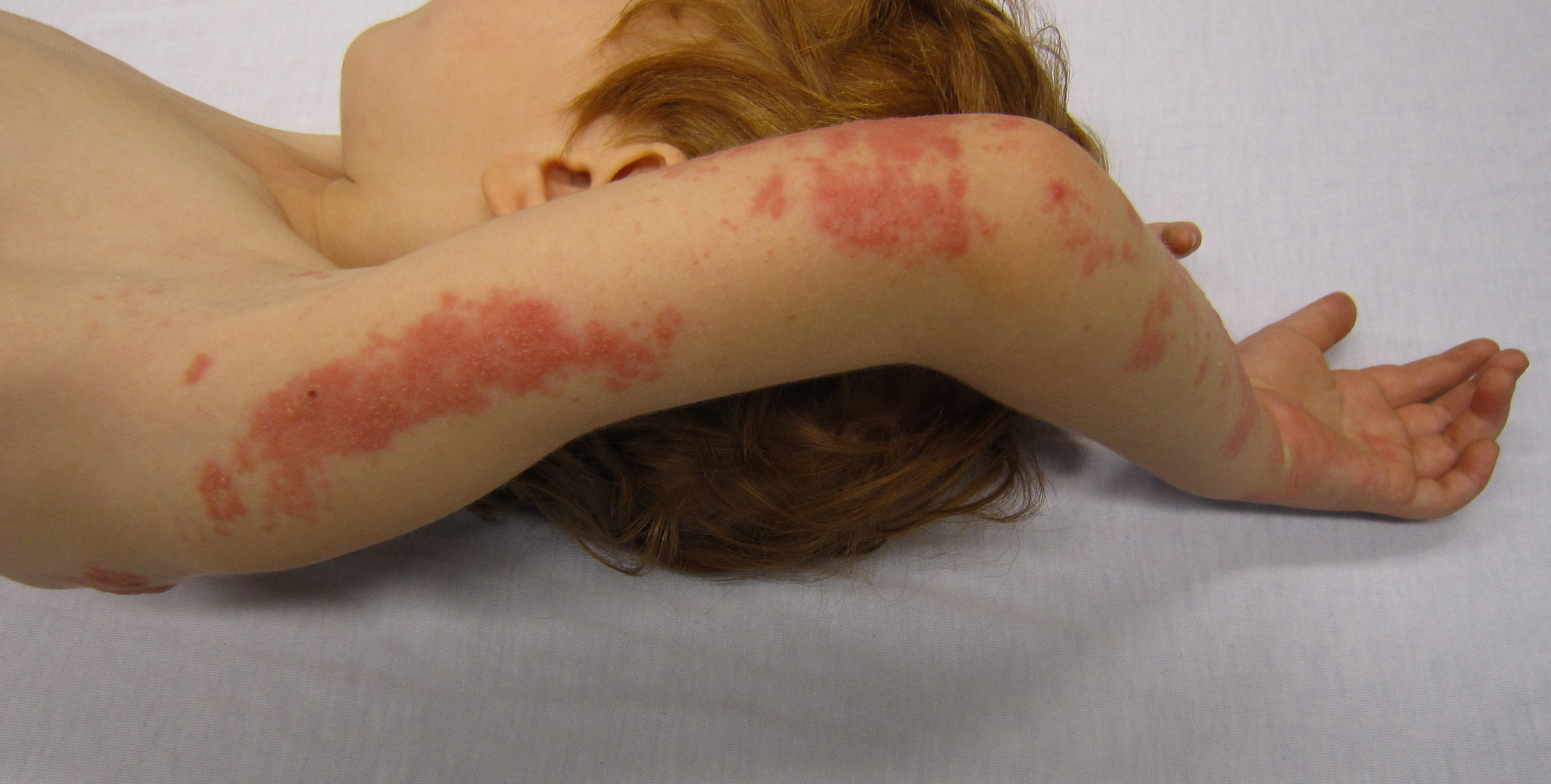
A case of shingles that demonstrates a typical dermatomal distribution, here C8/T1

The earliest symptoms of shingles, which include headache, fever, and malaise, are nonspecific, and may result in an incorrect diagnosis. These symptoms are commonly followed by sensations of burning pain, itching, hyperesthesia (oversensitivity), or paresthesia ("pins and needles": tingling, pricking, or numbness). Pain can be mild to severe in the affected dermatome, with sensations that are often described as stinging, tingling, aching, numbing or throbbing, and can be interspersed with quick stabs of agonizing pain.

Shingles in children is often painless, but people are more likely to get shingles as they age, and the disease tends to be more severe.

In most cases, after one to two days, and sometimes as long as three weeks, the initial phase is followed by the appearance of the characteristic skin rash. The pain and rash most commonly occur on the torso but can appear on the face, eyes, or other parts of the body. At first, the rash appears similar to hives; however, unlike hives, shingles causes skin changes limited to a dermatome, typically resulting in a stripe- or belt-like pattern on one side of the body that does not cross the midline. Zoster sine herpete ("zoster without herpes") describes a person who has all of the symptoms of shingles except this characteristic rash.

Later, the rash becomes vesicular, forming small blisters filled with a serous exudate, as the fever and general malaise continue. The painful vesicles eventually become cloudy or darkened as they fill with blood and crust over within seven to ten days; usually, the crusts fall off, and the skin heals, but sometimes, after severe blistering, scarring, and discolored skin remain. The blister fluid contains varicella zoster virus, which can be transmitted through contact or inhalation of fluid droplets until the lesions crust over, which may take up to four weeks.

Development of the shingles rash
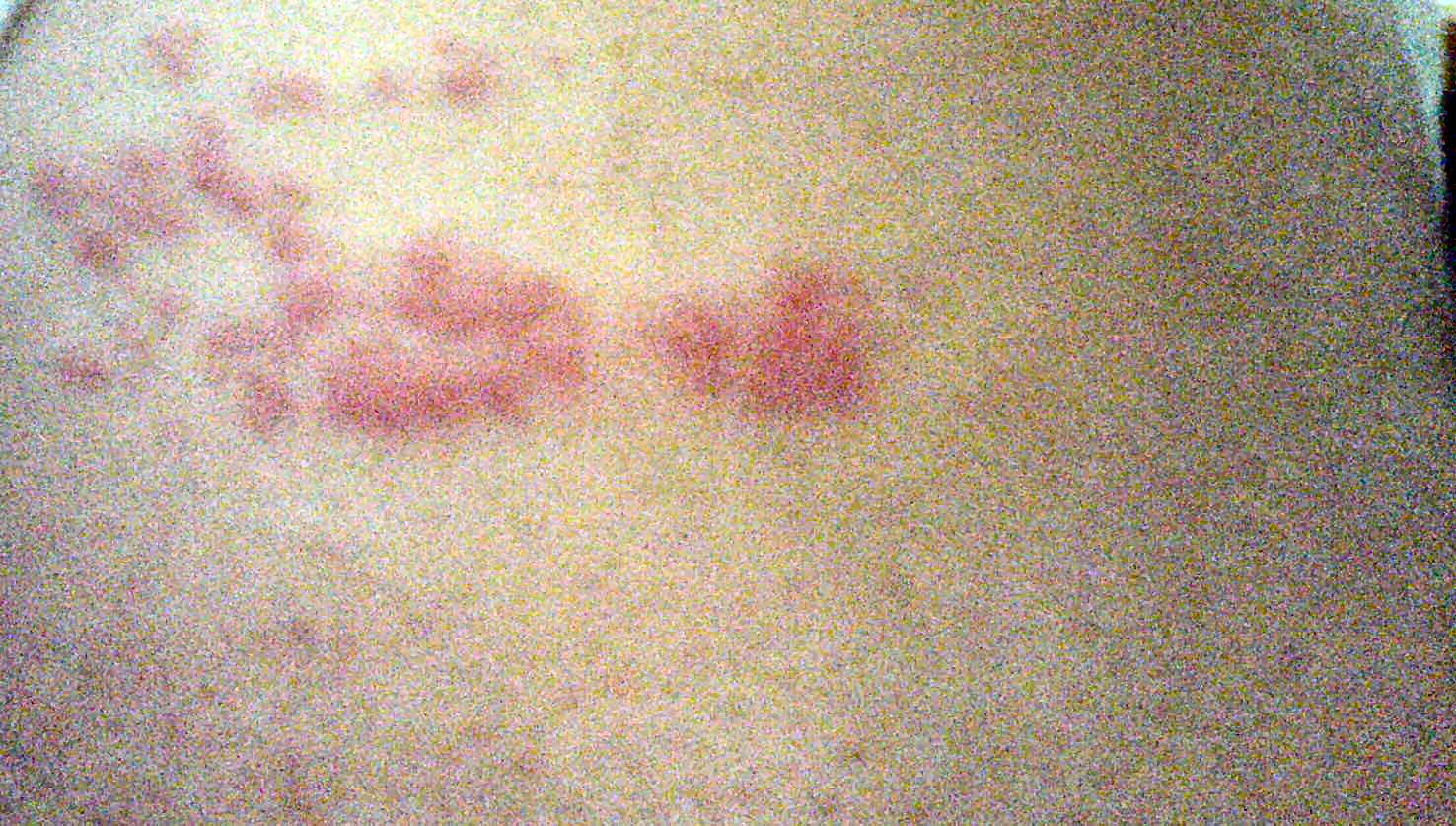
Day 1

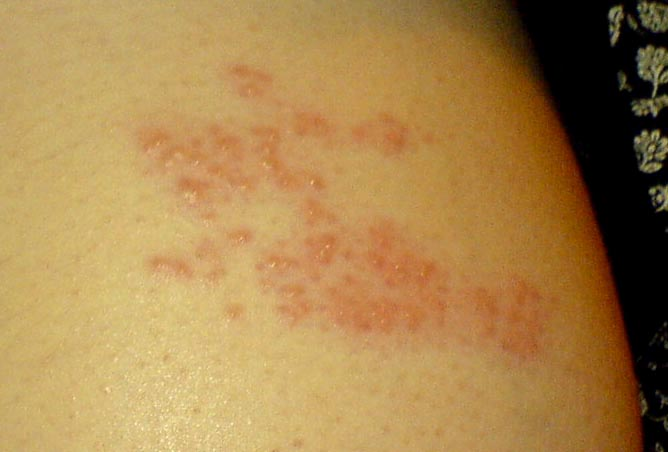
Day 2

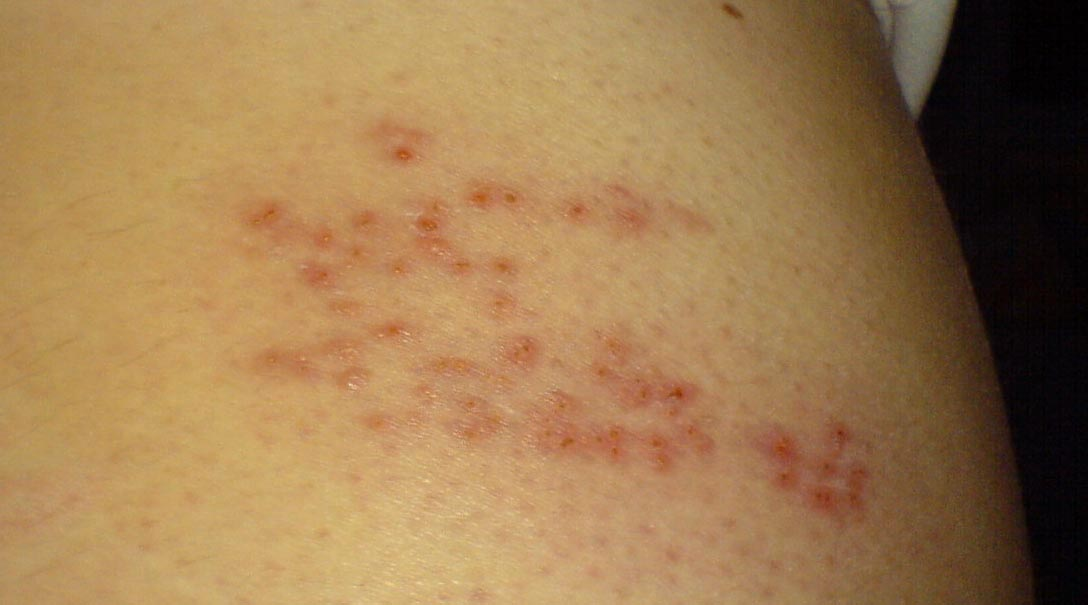
Day 5

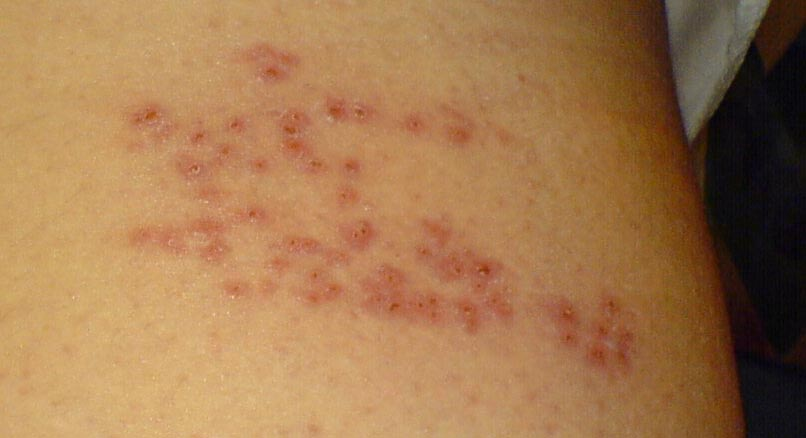
Day 6

=== Face ===
Shingles may have additional symptoms, depending on the dermatome involved. The trigeminal nerve is the most commonly involved nerve, of which the ophthalmic division is the most commonly involved branch. When the virus is reactivated in this nerve branch, it is termed zoster ophthalmicus. The skin of the forehead, upper eyelid, and orbit of the eye may be involved. Zoster ophthalmicus occurs in approximately 10–25% of cases. In some people, symptoms may include conjunctivitis, keratitis, uveitis, and optic nerve palsies, which can sometimes cause chronic ocular inflammation, vision loss, and debilitating pain.

Shingles oticus, also known as Ramsay Hunt syndrome type II, involves the ear. It is thought to result from the virus spreading from the facial nerve to the vestibulocochlear nerve. Symptoms include hearing loss and vertigo (rotational dizziness).

Shingles may occur in the mouth if the maxillary or mandibular division of the trigeminal nerve is affected, in which the rash may appear on the mucous membrane of the upper jaw (usually the palate, sometimes the gums of the upper teeth) or the lower jaw (tongue or gums of the lower teeth) respectively. Oral involvement may occur alone or in combination with a rash on the skin over the cutaneous distribution of the same trigeminal branch. As with shingles of the skin, the lesions tend to only involve one side, distinguishing it from other oral blistering conditions. In the mouth, shingles appears initially as 1–4 mm opaque blisters (vesicles), which break down quickly to leave ulcers that heal within 10–14 days. The prodromal pain (before the rash) may be confused with toothache. Sometimes this leads to unnecessary dental treatment. Post-herpetic neuralgia is uncommonly associated with shingles in the mouth. Unusual complications may occur with intra-oral shingles that are not seen elsewhere. Due to the close relationship of blood vessels to nerves, the virus can spread to involve the blood vessels and compromise the blood supply, sometimes causing ischemic necrosis. In rare cases, oral involvement causes complications such as osteonecrosis, tooth loss, periodontitis (gum disease), pulp calcification, pulp necrosis, periapical lesions and tooth developmental anomalies.

=== Disseminated shingles ===
In those with deficits in immune function, disseminated shingles may occur (wide rash). It is defined as more than 20 skin lesions appearing outside either the primarily affected dermatome and directly adjacent dermatomes, or appearing on 3 or more dermatomes. Besides the skin, other organs, such as the liver or brain, may also be affected (causing hepatitis or encephalitis, respectively), making the condition potentially lethal. Disseminated shingles occurs in 2% of the general population, and 15-30% of immunocompromised individuals.

== Pathophysiology ==
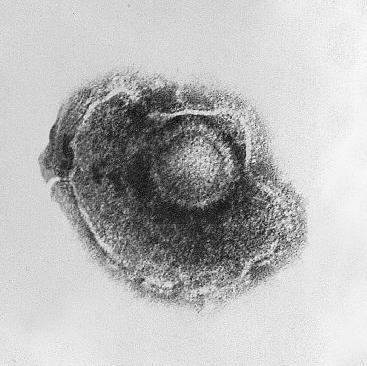
Electron micrograph of varicella zoster virus. Approximately 150,000× magnification. The virus diameter is 150–200 nm.

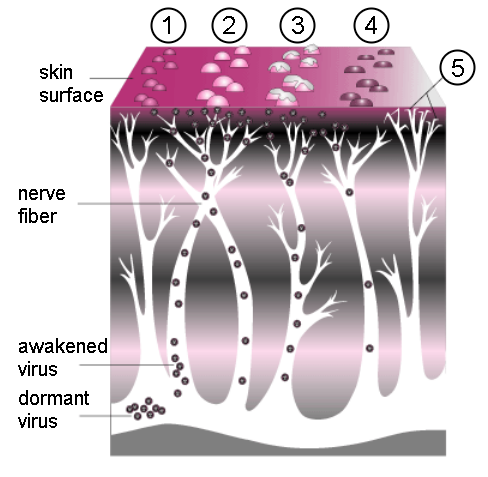
Progression of shingles. A cluster of small bumps (1) turns into blisters (2). The blisters fill with lymph, break open (3), crust over (4), and finally disappear. Postherpetic neuralgia can sometimes occur due to nerve damage (5).

The causative agent for shingles is the varicella zoster virus (VZV)—a double-stranded DNA virus related to the herpes simplex virus and member of Herpesviridae. The complete sequence of the viral genome was published in 1986. Most individuals are infected with this virus as children, which causes an episode of chickenpox. The immune system eventually eliminates the virus from most locations, but it remains dormant (or latent) in the ganglia adjacent to the spinal cord (called the dorsal root ganglion) or the trigeminal ganglion in the base of the skull.

Shingles occurs only in people who have been previously infected with VZV; although it can occur at any age, approximately half of the cases in the United States occur in those aged 50 years or older. Shingles can recur. In contrast to the frequent recurrence of herpes simplex symptoms, repeated attacks of shingles are unusual. It is extremely rare for a person to have more than three recurrences.

The disease results from virus particles in a single sensory ganglion switching from their latent phase to their active phase. Due to difficulties in studying VZV reactivation directly in humans (leading to reliance on small-animal models), its latency is less well understood than that of the herpes simplex virus. Virus-specific proteins continue to be made by the infected cells during the latent period, so true latency, as opposed to chronic, low-level, active infection, has not been proven to occur in VZV infections. Although VZV has been detected in autopsies of nervous tissue, there are no methods to find dormant virus in the ganglia of living people.

Unless the immune system is compromised, it suppresses viral reactivation and prevents shingles outbreaks. Why this suppression sometimes fails is poorly understood, but shingles is more likely to occur in people whose immune systems are impaired due to aging, immunosuppressive therapy, psychological stress, or other factors. Upon reactivation, the virus replicates in neuronal cell bodies, and virions are shed from the cells and carried down the axons to the area of skin innervated by that ganglion. In the skin, the virus causes local inflammation and blistering. The short- and long-term pain caused by shingles outbreaks originates from inflammation of affected nerves due to the widespread growth of the virus in those areas.

As with chickenpox and other alpha-herpesvirus infections, direct contact with an active rash can spread the virus to a person who lacks immunity. This newly infected individual may then develop chickenpox, but will not immediately develop shingles.

== Diagnosis ==
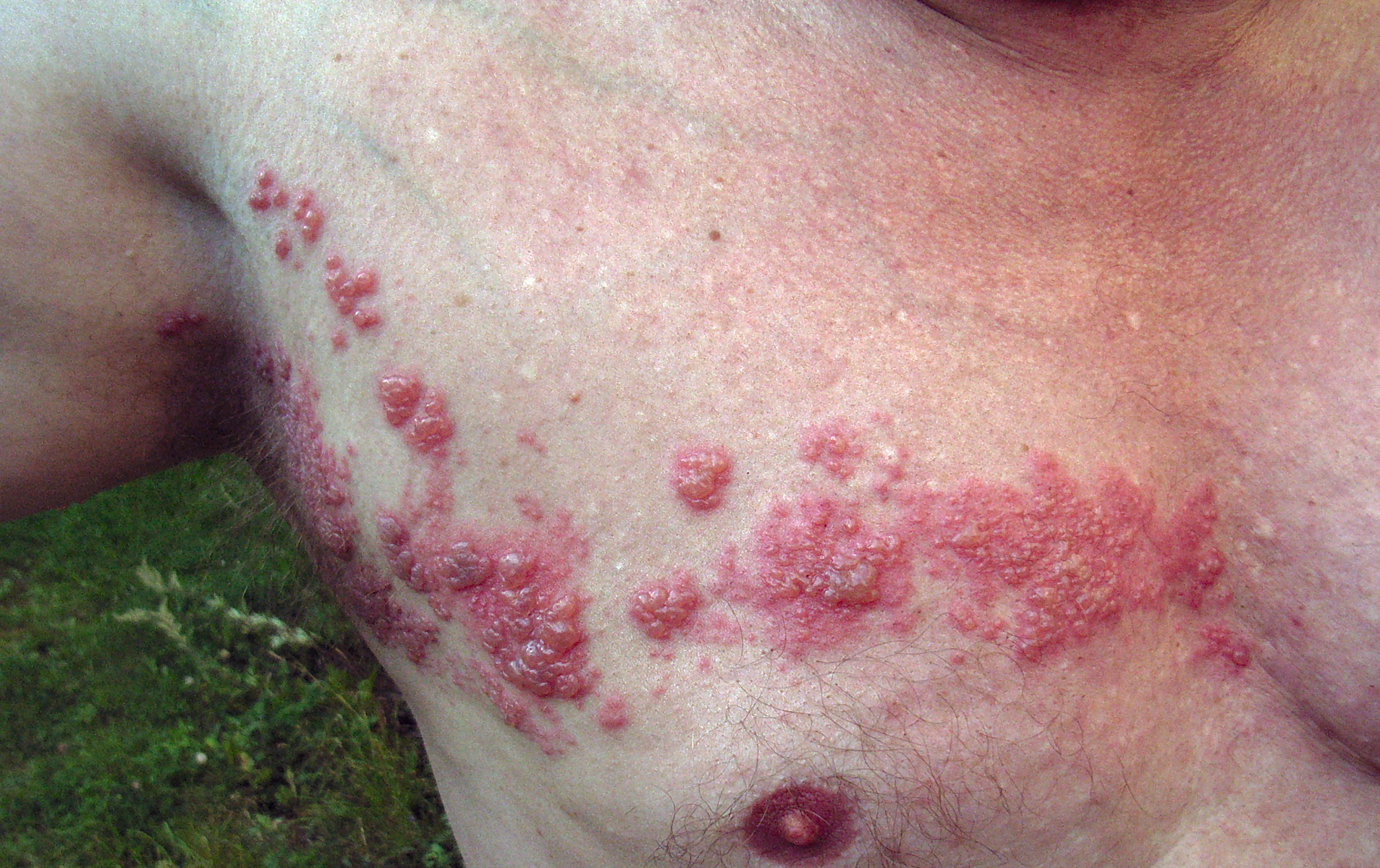
Shingles on the chest

If the rash has appeared, identifying this disease (making a differential diagnosis) requires only a visual examination, since very few diseases produce a rash in a dermatomal pattern. However, herpes simplex virus (HSV) can occasionally produce a rash in such a pattern (zosteriform herpes simplex).

When the rash is absent (early or late in the disease, or in the case of zoster sine herpete), shingles can be difficult to diagnose. Apart from the rash, most symptoms can also occur in other conditions.

Laboratory tests are available to diagnose shingles. The most popular test detects VZV-specific IgM antibody in blood; this appears only during chickenpox or shingles and not while the virus is dormant. In larger laboratories, lymph collected from a blister is tested by polymerase chain reaction (PCR) for VZV DNA, or examined with an electron microscope for virus particles. Molecular biology tests based on in vitro nucleic acid amplification (PCR tests) are currently considered the most reliable. Nested PCR test has high sensitivity, but is susceptible to contamination leading to false positive results. The latest real-time PCR tests are rapid, easy to perform, and as sensitive as nested PCR, and have a lower risk of contamination. They also have more sensitivity than viral cultures.

=== Differential diagnosis ===
Shingles can be confused with herpes simplex, dermatitis herpetiformis and impetigo, and skin reactions caused by contact dermatitis, candidiasis, certain drugs and insect bites.

== Prevention ==
Shingles risk can be reduced in children by the varicella vaccine if the vaccine is administered before the individual gets chickenpox. If primary infection has already occurred, there are shingles vaccines that reduce the risk of developing shingles or developing severe shingles if the disease occurs. They include a live attenuated virus vaccine (Zostavax) and an adjuvanted subunit vaccine (Shingrix).

A review by Cochrane concluded that Zostavax was useful for preventing shingles for at least three years. This equates to about 50% relative risk reduction. The vaccine reduced the rate of persistent, severe pain after shingles by 66% among people who contracted shingles despite vaccination. Vaccine efficacy was maintained through four years of follow-up. It has been recommended that people with primary or acquired immunodeficiency should not receive the live vaccine.

Two doses of Shingrix are recommended, which provide about 90% protection at 3.5 years. As of 2016, it had been studied only in people with an intact immune system. It appears to also be effective in the very old.

In the UK, the National Health Service (NHS) offers shingles vaccination to all people aged 70 and over. As of 2021, Zostavax is the usual vaccine, but the Shingrix vaccine is recommended if Zostavax is unsuitable, for example, for those with immune system issues. Vaccination is not available to people over 80 as "it seems to be less effective in this age group". By August 2017, just under half of eligible 70–78 year olds had been vaccinated. About 3% of those eligible by age have conditions that suppress their immune system, and should not receive Zostavax. There had been 1,104 adverse reaction reports by April 2018. In the US, it is recommended that healthy adults 50 years and older receive two doses of Shingrix, two to six months apart.

== Treatment ==
Treatment aims to limit the severity and duration of pain, shorten the duration of a shingles episode, and reduce complications. Symptomatic treatment is often needed for the complication of postherpetic neuralgia. However, a study on untreated shingles shows that, once the rash has cleared, postherpetic neuralgia is very rare in people under 50 and wears off in time; in older people, the pain wore off more slowly, but even in people over 70, 85% were free from pain a year after their shingles outbreak.

=== Analgesics ===
People with mild to moderate pain can be treated with over-the-counter pain medications. Topical lotions containing calamine can be used on the rash or blisters and may be soothing. Occasionally, severe pain may require an opioid medication, such as morphine. Once the lesions have crusted over, capsaicin cream (Zostrix) can be used. Topical lidocaine and nerve blocks may also reduce pain. Administering gabapentin along with antivirals may offer relief of postherpetic neuralgia.

=== Antivirals ===
Antiviral drugs may reduce the severity and duration of shingles; however, they do not prevent postherpetic neuralgia. Of these drugs, aciclovir has been the standard treatment, but the newer drugs valaciclovir and famciclovir demonstrate similar or superior efficacy and good safety and tolerability. The drugs are used both for prevention (for example in people with HIV/AIDS) and as therapy during the acute phase. Complications in immunocompromised individuals with shingles may be reduced with intravenous aciclovir. In people who are at a high risk for repeated attacks of shingles, five daily oral doses of aciclovir are usually effective.

=== Steroids ===
Corticosteroids do not appear to decrease the risk of long-term pain. Side effects, however, appear to be minimal. Their use in Ramsay Hunt syndrome had not been properly studied as of 2008.

=== Zoster ophthalmicus ===
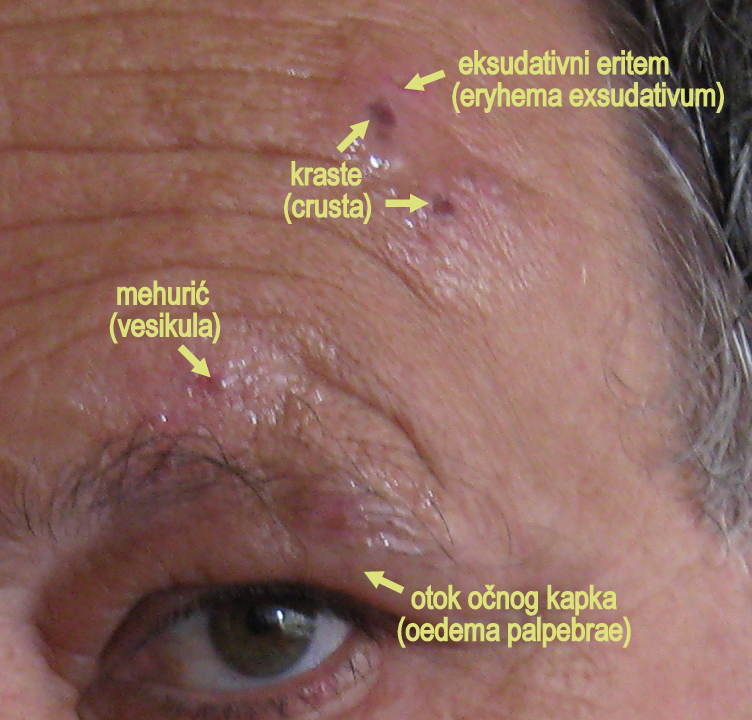
Zoster ophthalmicus. Labels in Serbian, from top: exudative erythema, scabs, blister, eyelid swelling

Treatment for zoster ophthalmicus uses antiviral drugs, antibiotics, or topical corticosteroids.

== Prognosis ==
The rash and pain usually subside within three to five weeks, but about one in five people develop a painful condition called postherpetic neuralgia, which is often difficult to manage. In some people, shingles can reactivate, presenting as zoster sine herpete: pain radiating along the path of a single spinal nerve (a dermatomal distribution), but without an accompanying rash. This condition may involve complications that affect several levels of the nervous system and cause many cranial neuropathies, polyneuritis, myelitis, or aseptic meningitis. Other serious effects that may occur in some cases include partial facial paralysis (usually temporary), ear damage, or encephalitis. Although initial infections with VZV during pregnancy, causing chickenpox, may lead to infection of the fetus and complications in the newborn, chronic infection or reactivation in shingles are not associated with fetal infection.

There is a slightly increased risk of developing cancer after a shingles episode. However, the mechanism is unclear, and mortality from cancer did not appear to increase as a direct result of the presence of the virus. Instead, the increased risk may result from the immune suppression that allows the reactivation of the virus.

Although shingles typically resolves within 3–5 weeks, certain complications may arise:

- Secondary bacterial infection.
- Motor involvement, including weakness especially in "motor herpes zoster".
- Eye involvement: trigeminal nerve involvement (as seen in herpes ophthalmicus) should be treated early and aggressively, as it may lead to blindness. Involvement of the tip of the nose in the zoster rash is a strong predictor of herpes ophthalmicus.
- Postherpetic neuralgia, a condition of chronic pain following shingles.

== Epidemiology ==
Varicella zoster virus (VZV) has a high level of infectivity and has a worldwide prevalence. Shingles is a reactivation of latent VZV infection: zoster can only occur in someone who has previously had chickenpox (varicella).

Shingles has no relationship to season and does not occur in epidemics. There is, however, a strong relationship with increasing age. The incidence rate of shingles ranges from 1.2 to 3.4 per 1,000 person‐years among younger healthy individuals, increasing to 3.9–11.8 per 1,000 person‐years among those older than 65 years, and incidence rates worldwide are similar. This relationship with age has been demonstrated in many countries, and is attributed to the fact that cellular immunity declines as people grow older.

Another important risk factor is immunosuppression. Other risk factors include psychological stress. According to a study in North Carolina, "black subjects were significantly less likely to develop zoster than were white subjects." It is unclear whether the risk is different by sex. Other potential risk factors include mechanical trauma and exposure to immunotoxins.

There is no strong evidence for a genetic link or a link to family history. A 2008 study showed that people with close relatives who had shingles were twice as likely to develop it themselves, but a 2010 study found no such link.

Adults with latent VZV infection who are exposed intermittently to children with chickenpox receive an immune boost. This periodic boost to the immune system helps to prevent shingles in older adults. When routine chickenpox vaccination was introduced in the United States, there was concern that, because older adults would no longer receive this natural periodic boost, there would be an increase in the incidence of shingles.

Multiple studies and surveillance data, at least when viewed superficially, demonstrate no consistent trends in incidence in the U.S. since the chickenpox vaccination program began in 1995. However, upon closer inspection, the two studies that showed no increase in shingles incidence were conducted among populations where varicella vaccination was not as yet widespread in the community. A later study by Patel et al. concluded that since the introduction of the chickenpox vaccine, hospitalization costs for complications of shingles increased by more than $700 million annually for those over age 60. Another study by Yih et al. reported that as varicella vaccine coverage in children increased, the incidence of varicella decreased, and the occurrence of shingles among adults increased by 90%. The results of a further study by Yawn et al. showed a 28% increase in shingles incidence from 1996 to 2001. It is likely that incidence rate will change in the future, due to the aging of the population, changes in therapy for malignant and autoimmune diseases, and changes in chickenpox vaccination rates; a wide adoption of zoster vaccination could dramatically reduce the incidence rate.

In one study, it was estimated that 26% of those who contract shingles eventually present complications. Postherpetic neuralgia arises in approximately 20% of people with shingles. A study of 1994 California data found hospitalization rates of 2.1 per 100,000 person-years, rising to 9.3 per 100,000 person-years for ages 60 and up. An earlier Connecticut study found a higher hospitalization rate; the difference may be due to the prevalence of HIV in the earlier study, or to the introduction of antivirals in California before 1994.

== History ==
Shingles has a long recorded history, although historical accounts fail to distinguish the blistering caused by VZV and those caused by smallpox, ergotism, and erysipelas. Aulus Cornelius Celsus, around 25 BC to 50 AD, first used the term herpes zoster. In the late 18th century William Heberden established a way to differentiate shingles and smallpox, and in the late 19th century, shingles was differentiated from erysipelas. In 1831 Richard Bright hypothesized that the disease arose from the dorsal root ganglion, and an 1861 paper by Felix von Bärensprung confirmed this.

Recognition that chickenpox and shingles were caused by the same virus came at the beginning of the 20th century. Physicians began to report that cases of shingles were often followed by chickenpox in younger people who lived with the person with shingles. The idea of an association between the two diseases gained strength when it was shown that lymph from a person with shingles could induce chickenpox in young volunteers. This was finally proved by the first isolation of the virus in cell cultures, by the Nobel laureate Thomas Huckle Weller, in 1953. Some sources also attribute the first isolation of the herpes zoster virus to Evelyn Nicol.

Until the 1940s, the disease was considered benign, and serious complications were thought to be very rare. However, by 1942, it was recognized that shingles was a more serious disease in adults than in children and that it increased in frequency with advancing age. Further studies during the 1950s on immunosuppressed individuals showed that the disease was not as benign as once thought, and the search for various therapeutic and preventive measures began. By the mid-1960s, several studies identified the gradual reduction in cellular immunity in old age, observing that in a cohort of 1,000 people who lived to the age of 85, approximately 500 (i.e., 50%) would have at least one attack of shingles, and 10 (i.e., 1%) would have at least two attacks.

In historical shingles studies, shingles incidence generally increased with age. However, in his 1965 paper, Hope-Simpson suggested that the "peculiar age distribution of zoster may in part reflect the frequency with which the different age groups encounter cases of varicella and because of the ensuing boost to their antibody protection have their attacks of zoster postponed". Lending support to this hypothesis that contact with children with chickenpox boosts adult cell-mediated immunity to help postpone or suppress shingles, a study by Thomas et al. reported that adults in households with children had lower rates of shingles than households without children. Also, the study by Terada et al. indicated that pediatricians reflected incidence rates from 1/2 to 1/8 that of the general population their age.

== Etymology ==
The family name of all the herpesviruses derives from the Greek word έρπης herpēs, from έρπω herpein ("to creep"), referring to the latent, recurring infections typical of this group of viruses. Zoster comes from Greek ζωστήρ zōstēr, meaning "belt" or "girdle", after the characteristic belt-like dermatomal rash. The common name for the disease, shingles, derives from the Latin cingulus, a variant of Latin cingulum, meaning "girdle".

== Research ==
Until the mid-1990s, infectious complications of the central nervous system (CNS) caused by VZV reactivation were regarded as rare. The presence of rash, as well as specific neurological symptoms, was required to diagnose a CNS infection caused by VZV. Since 2000, PCR testing has become more widely used, and the number of diagnosed cases of CNS infection has increased.

Classic textbook descriptions state that VZV reactivation in the CNS is restricted to immunocompromised individuals and the elderly; however, studies have found that most participants are immunocompetent and younger than 60 years old. Historically, vesicular rash was considered a characteristic finding, but studies have found that rash is only present in 45% of cases. In addition, systemic inflammation is not as reliable an indicator as previously thought: the mean level of C-reactive protein and mean white blood cell count are within the normal range in participants with VZV meningitis. MRI and CT scans are usually normal in cases of VZV reactivation in the CNS. CSF pleocytosis, previously thought to be a strong indicator of VZV encephalitis, was absent in half of a group of people diagnosed with VZV encephalitis by PCR.

The frequency of CNS infections presented at the emergency room of a community hospital is not negligible, so a means of diagnosing cases is needed. PCR is not a foolproof method of diagnosis, but because so many other indicators have turned out not to be reliable in diagnosing VZV infections in the CNS, PCR is the recommended method of testing for VZV. Negative PCR does not rule out VZV involvement, but a positive PCR can be used for diagnosis, and appropriate treatment can be started (for example, antivirals can be prescribed rather than antibiotics).

The introduction of DNA analysis techniques has shown that some complications of varicella-zoster are more common than previously thought. For example, sporadic meningoencephalitis (ME) caused by varicella-zoster was regarded as a rare disease, mostly related to childhood chickenpox. However, meningoencephalitis caused by varicella-zoster is increasingly recognized as a predominant cause of ME among immunocompetent adults in non-epidemic circumstances.

Diagnosis of complications of varicella-zoster, particularly in cases where the disease reactivates after years or decades of latency, is difficult. A rash (shingles) can be present or absent. Symptoms vary, and there is a significant overlap in symptoms with herpes simplex symptoms.

Although DNA analysis techniques such as polymerase chain reaction (PCR) can be used to look for DNA of herpesviruses in spinal fluid or blood, the results may be negative, even in cases where other definitive symptoms exist. Notwithstanding these limitations, the use of PCR has resulted in an advance in the state of the art in our understanding of herpesviruses, including VZV, during the 1990s and 2000s. For example, in the past, clinicians believed that encephalitis was caused by herpes simplex and that people always died or developed serious long-term functional problems. People were diagnosed at autopsy or by brain biopsy. Brain biopsy is not undertaken lightly: it is reserved only for serious cases that cannot be diagnosed by less invasive methods. For this reason, knowledge of these herpes virus conditions was limited to severe cases. DNA techniques have made it possible to diagnose "mild" cases, caused by VZV or HSV, in which the symptoms include fever, headache, and altered mental status. Mortality rates in treated people are decreasing.
