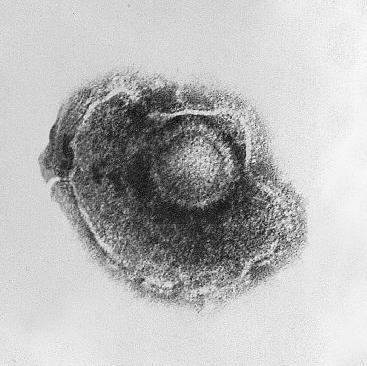
- Electron micrograph of a Human alphaherpesvirus 3 virion

Virus classification
- (unranked): Virus
- Realm: Duplodnaviria
- Kingdom: Heunggongvirae
- Phylum: Peploviricota
- Class: Herviviricetes
- Order: Herpesvirales
- Family: Orthoherpesviridae
- Genus: Varicellovirus
- Species: Varicellovirus humanalpha3

Synonyms
- Varicella-zoster virus, VZV; Human alphaherpesvirus 3; Human herpesvirus 3, HHV-3, HHV3

= Varicella zoster virus =

Herpes virus that causes chickenpox and shingles

Varicella zoster virus (VZV), also known as human herpesvirus 3 (HHV-3, HHV3), is one of nine known herpes viruses that can infect humans. It causes chickenpox (varicella), commonly affecting children and young adults, and shingles (herpes zoster) in adults but rarely in children. As a late complication of VZV infection, Ramsay Hunt syndrome type 2 may develop in rare cases. VZV infections are species-specific to humans. The virus can survive in external environments for a few hours.

VZV multiplies in the tonsils, and causes a wide variety of symptoms. Similar to the herpes simplex viruses, after primary infection with VZV (chickenpox), the virus lies dormant in neurons, including the cranial nerve ganglia, dorsal root ganglia, and autonomic ganglia. Many years after the person has recovered from initial chickenpox infection, VZV can reactivate to cause shingles.

== Epidemiology ==
=== Chickenpox ===
Primary varicella zoster virus infection results in chickenpox (varicella), which may result in complications including encephalitis, pneumonia (either direct viral pneumonia or secondary bacterial pneumonia), or bronchitis (either viral bronchitis or secondary bacterial bronchitis). Even when clinical symptoms of chickenpox have resolved, VZV remains dormant in the nervous system of the infected person (virus latency), in the trigeminal and dorsal root ganglia. VZV enters through the respiratory system and has an incubation period of 10–21 days, with an average of 14 days. Targeting the skin and peripheral nerves, the period of illness lasts about 3 to 4 days. Infected individuals are most contagious 1–2 days before the lesions appear. Signs and symptoms include vesicles that fill with pus, rupture, and scab before healing. Lesions most commonly occur on the face, throat, the lower back, the chest, and the shoulders.

=== Shingles ===
In about a third of cases, VZV reactivates in later life, producing a disease known as shingles or herpes zoster. The individual lifetime risk of developing herpes zoster is thought to be between 20% and 30%, or approximately 1 in 4 people. However, for people aged 85 and over, this risk increases to 1 in 2. In a 2015 study in Sweden by Nilsson, Cassel, and Lindquist, the annual incidence of herpes zoster was estimated at 315 cases per 100,000 inhabitants across all ages and 577 cases per 100,000 among people 50 years of age or older.

VZV can also infect the central nervous system (CNS), with a 2013 article in the International Journal of Infectious Diseases reporting an incidence of 1.02 CNS infections per 100,000 between January 2003 and July 2010 at a hospital in Switzerland.

Shingles lesions and the associated neuropathic pain, often described as burning, tend to occur on the skin that is innervated by one or two adjacent sensory nerves, almost always on one side of the body only. The skin lesions usually subside over the course of several weeks, while the pain often persists longer. In 10–15% of cases, the pain persists more than three months, a chronic and often disabling condition known as postherpetic neuralgia. Other serious complications of varicella zoster infection include Mollaret's meningitis, zoster multiplex, inflammation of arteries in the brain leading to stroke, myelitis, herpes zoster ophthalmicus, or zoster sine herpete. In Ramsay Hunt syndrome type II, VZV affects the geniculate ganglion, leaving lesions that follow specific branches of the facial nerve. Symptoms may include painful blisters on the tongue and ear, along with one-sided facial weakness and hearing loss. After infection during the initial stages of pregnancy, the fetus can be severely injured. Reye's syndrome can happen after initial infection, causing continuous vomiting and signs of brain dysfunction such as extreme drowsiness or combative behavior. In some cases, death or coma can follow. Reye's syndrome mostly affects children and teenagers; using aspirin during infection can increase this risk.

== Morphology ==
VZV is closely related to the herpes simplex viruses (HSV), sharing much genome homology. The known envelope glycoproteins (gB, gC, gE, gH, gI, gK, gL) correspond with those in HSV; however, there is no equivalent of the HSV gD protein. VZV also fails to produce the LAT (latency-associated transcripts) that play an important role in establishing HSV latency (herpes simplex virus). VZV virions are spherical and 180–200 nm in diameter. Their lipid envelope encloses the 100 nm nucleocapsid of 162 hexameric and pentameric capsomeres arranged in an icosahedral form. Its DNA is a single, linear, double-stranded molecule, 125,000 nt long. The capsid is surrounded by loosely associated proteins known collectively as the tegument; many of these proteins play critical roles in initiating the process of virus reproduction in the infected cell. The tegument is in turn covered by a lipid envelope studded with glycoproteins that are displayed on the exterior of the virion, each approximately 8 nm long.

== Genomes ==
The genome was first sequenced in 1986. It is a linear duplex DNA molecule, a laboratory strain has 124,884 base pairs. The genome has two predominant isomers, depending on the orientation of the S segment, P (prototype) and I_{S} (inverted S) which are present with equal frequency for a total frequency of 90–95%. The L segment can also be inverted resulting in a total of four linear isomers (I_{L} and I_{LS}). This is distinct from HSV's equiprobable distribution, and the discriminatory mechanism is not known. A small percentage of isolated molecules are circular genomes, about which little is known. (It is known that HSV circularizes on infection.) There are at least 70 open reading frames in the genome.

== Evolution ==
Commonality with HSV1 and HSV2 indicates a common ancestor; five genes (out of about 70) do not have corresponding HSV genes. Relation with other human herpes viruses is less strong, but many homologues and conserved gene blocks are still found.

There are at least five clades of this virus. Clades 1 and 3 include European/North American strains; clade 2 are Asian strains, especially from Japan; and clade 5 appears to be based in India. Clade 4 includes some strains from Europe but its geographic origins need further clarification. There are also four genotypes that do not fit into these clades. Allocation of VZV strains to clades required the sequence of whole virus genome. Practically all molecular epidemiological data on global VZV strains distribution are obtained with targeted sequencing of selected regions.

Phylogenetic analysis of VZV genomic sequences resolves wild-type strains into nine genotypes (E1, E2, J, M1, M2, M3, M4, VIII and IX). Complete sequences for M3 and M4 strains are unavailable, but targeted analyses of representative strains suggest they are stable, circulating VZV genotypes. Sequence analysis of VZV isolates identified both shared and specific markers for every genotype and validated a unified VZV genotyping strategy. Despite high genotype diversity no evidence for intra-genotypic recombination was observed. Five of seven VZV genotypes were reliably discriminated using only four single nucleotide polymorphisms (SNP) present in ORF22, and the E1 and E2 genotypes were resolved using SNP located in ORF21, ORF22 or ORF50. Sequence analysis of 342 clinical varicella and zoster specimens from 18 European countries identified the following distribution of VZV genotypes: E1, 221 (65%); E2, 87 (25%); M1, 20 (6%); M2, 3 (1%); M4, 11 (3%). No M3 or J strains were observed. Of 165 clinical varicella and zoster isolates from Australia and New Zealand typed using this approach, 67 of 127 eastern Australian isolates were E1, 30 were E2, 16 were J, 10 were M1, and 4 were M2; 25 of 38 New Zealand isolates were E1, 8 were E2, and 5 were M1.

The mutation rate for synonymous and nonsynonymous mutation rates among the herpesviruses have been estimated at 1 × 10^{−7} and 2.7 × 10^{−8} mutations/site/year, respectively, based on the highly conserved gB gene.

== Treatment ==
Within the human body it can be treated by a number of drugs and therapeutic agents including acyclovir for chickenpox, famciclovir, valaciclovir for the shingles, zoster-immune globulin (ZIG), and vidarabine. Acyclovir is frequently used as the drug of choice in primary VZV infections, and beginning its administration early can significantly shorten the duration of any symptoms. However, reaching an effective serum concentration of acyclovir typically requires intravenous administration, making its use more difficult outside of a hospital.

== Vaccination ==
A live attenuated VZV Oka/Merck strain vaccine is available and is marketed in the United States under the trade name Varivax. It was developed by Merck, Sharp & Dohme in the 1980s from the Oka strain virus isolated and attenuated by Michiaki Takahashi and colleagues in the 1970s. It was submitted to the US Food and Drug Administration (FDA) for approval in 1990 and was approved in 1995. Since then, it has been added to the recommended vaccination schedules for children in Australia, the United States, and many other countries. Varicella vaccination has raised concerns in some that the immunity induced by the vaccine may not be lifelong, possibly leaving adults vulnerable to more severe disease as the immunity from their childhood immunization wanes. Vaccine coverage in the United States in the population recommended for vaccination is approaching 90%, with concomitant reductions in the incidence of varicella cases and hospitalizations and deaths due to VZV. So far, clinical data have shown that the vaccine is effective for over ten years in preventing varicella in healthy individuals, and when breakthrough infections do occur, illness is typically mild. In 2006, the CDC's Advisory Committee on Immunization Practices (ACIP) recommended a second dose of vaccine before school entry to ensure the maintenance of high levels of varicella immunity.

In 2006, the FDA approved Zostavax for the prevention of shingles. Zostavax is a more concentrated formulation of Varivax, designed to elicit an immune response in older adults whose immunity to VZV wanes with advancing age. A systematic review by Cochrane (updated in 2023) showed that Zostavax reduced the incidence of shingles by almost 50%.

Shingrix is a subunit vaccine (HHV3 glycoprotein E) developed by GlaxoSmithKline, which was approved in the United States by the FDA in October 2017. The ACIP recommended Shingrix for adults over the age of 50, including those who have already received Zostavax. The committee voted that Shingrix is preferred over Zostavax for the prevention of zoster and related complications because phase 3 clinical data showed vaccine efficacy of >90% against shingles across all age groups, as well as sustained protection over a four-year follow-up. Unlike Zostavax, which is given as a single shot, Shingrix is given as two intramuscular doses, two to six months apart. This vaccine has shown to be immunogenic and safe in adults with HIV.

Shingrix may have protective effects against the development of dementia. One cohort study from 2025 examined the association between varicella zoster vaccination and dementia risk. It showed that people who had received one dose of Shingrix had 11% lower risk of dementia, compared to the unvaccinated. Having received two doses of the vaccine was associated with 32% decreased risk of dementia, compared to unvaccinated.

== History ==
Chickenpox-like rashes were recognized and described by ancient civilizations; the relationship between zoster and chickenpox was not realized until 1888. In 1943, the similarity between virus particles isolated from the lesions of zoster and those from chickenpox was noted. In 1974 the first chickenpox vaccine was introduced.

The varicella zoster virus was first isolated by Evelyn Nicol while she was working at Cleveland City Hospital. Thomas Huckle Weller also isolated the virus and found evidence that the same virus was responsible for both chickenpox and herpes zoster.

The name of the virus comes from the two diseases it causes, varicella and herpes zoster. The word varicella is possibly derived from variola, a term for smallpox coined by Rudolph Augustin Vogel in 1764.

== See also ==
- Herpes zoster ophthalmicus
- Herpes simplex virus
- Progressive outer retinal necrosis
- Simian varicella virus
