= Herpetic whitlow =

Fingertip skin lesion due to infection by the herpes virus

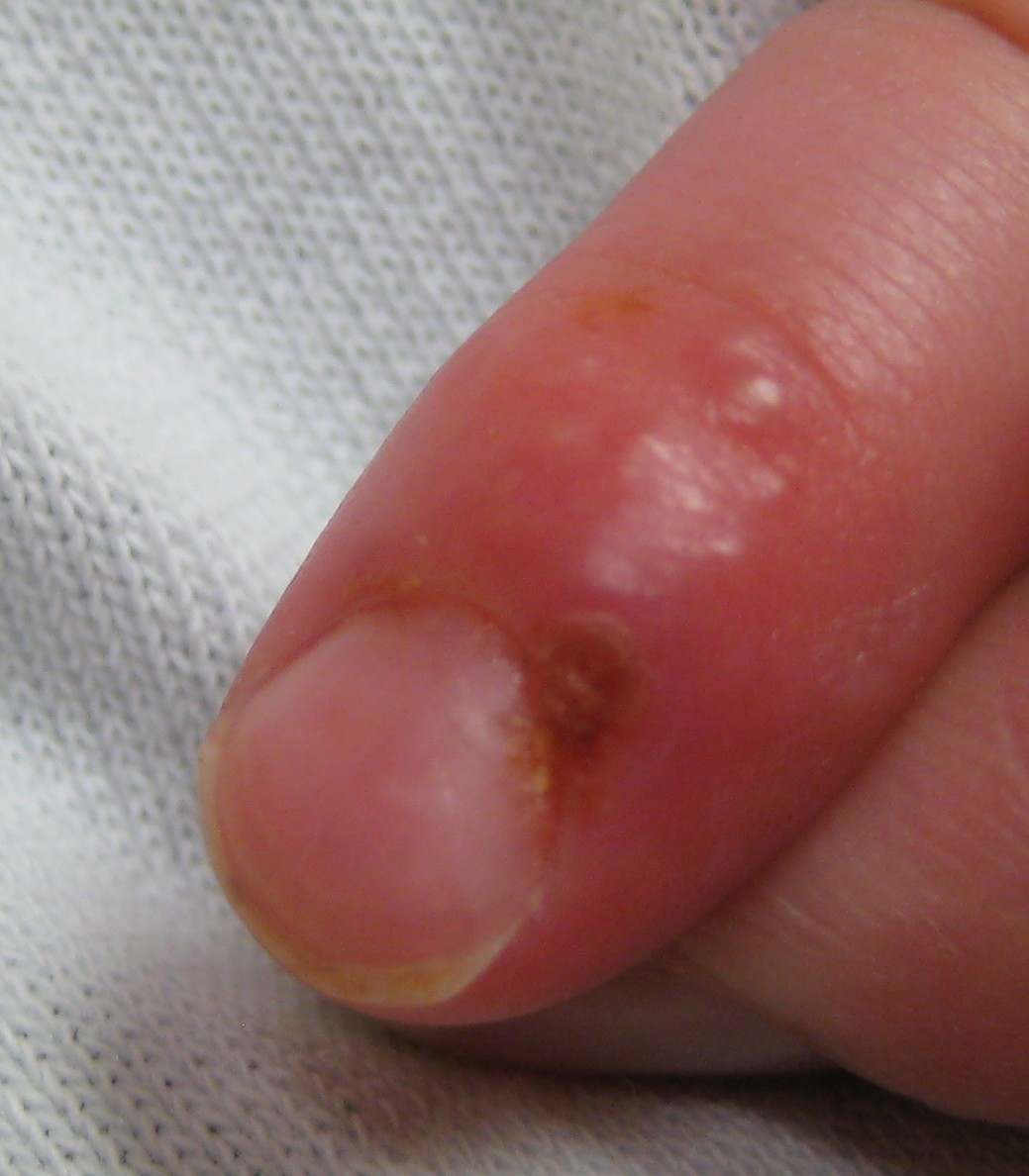
- Herpetic whitlow in a young child who earlier had developed herpes gingivostomatitis
- Specialty: Infectious diseases

A herpetic whitlow is a herpes lesion (whitlow), typically on a finger or thumb, caused by the herpes simplex virus (HSV). Occasionally infection occurs on the toes or on the nail cuticle. Herpes whitlow can be caused by infection by HSV-1 or HSV-2. HSV-1 whitlow is often contracted by health care workers that come in contact with the virus; it is most commonly contracted by dental workers and medical workers exposed to oral secretions. It is also often observed in thumb-sucking children with primary HSV-1 oral infection (autoinoculation) prior to seroconversion, and in adults aged 20 to 30 following contact with HSV-2-infected genitals.

== Symptoms and signs ==
Symptoms of herpetic whitlow include swelling, reddening, and tenderness of the infected part. This may be accompanied by fever and swollen lymph nodes. Small, clear vesicles initially form individually, then merge and become cloudy, unlike in bacterial whitlow when there is pus. Associated pain often seems largely relative to the physical symptoms. The herpes whitlow lesion usually heals in two to three weeks. It may reside in axillary sensory ganglia to cause recurrent herpetic lesions on that arm or digits. Blistering can occur in severe cases.

== Causes ==
In children the primary source of infection is the orofacial area, and it is commonly inferred that the virus (in this case commonly HSV-1) is transferred by the cutting, chewing or sucking of fingernail or thumbnail.

In adults, it is more common for the primary source to be the genital region, with a corresponding preponderance of HSV-2. It is also seen in adult health care workers such as dentists because of increased exposure to the herpes virus.

Contact sports are also a potential source of infection with herpetic whitlows.

== Treatment ==
Although it is a self-limited illness, oral or intravenous antiviral treatments, particularly acyclovir, have been used in the management of immunocompromised or severely infected patients. It is usually given when the condition fails to improve on its own. Topical acyclovir has not been shown to be effective in management of herpetic whitlow. Famciclovir has been demonstrated to effectively treat and prevent recurrent episodes. Lancing or surgically debriding the lesion may make it worse by causing a superinfection or encephalitis.

== Prognosis ==
Even though the disease is self-limiting, as with many herpes infections, the virus lies dormant in the peripheral nervous system. The disease recurs in about 20–50% of people. The most severe infection is usually the first one, with recurrences subsequently getting milder. The lesions the disease makes will either dry out, or burst, followed by healing. If the infected area is not touched, scars usually do not occur. The immunocompromised may have a hard time recovering, and have more frequent recurrences.

== See also ==
- Cold sore
- Genital herpes
- Herpes gladiatorum
- Herpes simplex
- List of cutaneous conditions
