= Herpes gladiatorum =

Disease caused by herpes

Herpes gladiatorum is one of the most infectious of herpes-caused diseases, and is transmissible by skin-to-skin contact. The disease was first described in the 1960s in the New England Journal of Medicine. It is caused by contagious infection with human herpes simplex virus type 1 (HSV-1), which more commonly causes oral herpes (cold sores). Another strain, HSV-2 usually causes genital herpes, although the strains are very similar and either can cause herpes in any location.

While the disease is commonly passed through normal human contact, it is strongly associated with contact sports—outbreaks in sporting clubs being relatively common. Other names for the disease are herpes rugbiorum or "scrumpox" (after rugby football), "wrestler's herpes" or "mat pox" (after wrestling, gymnastics, and cheerleading). In one of the largest outbreaks ever among high-school wrestlers at a four-week intensive training camp, HSV was identified in 60 of 175 wrestlers. Lesions were on the head in 73 percent of the wrestlers, the extremities in 42 percent, and the trunk in 28 percent. Physical symptoms sometimes recur in the skin. Previous adolescent HSV-1 seroconversion would preclude most herpes gladiatorum, but since stress and trauma are recognized triggers, such a person would be likely to infect others.

== Signs and symptoms ==
Herpes gladiatorum is characterized by a rash with clusters of sometimes painful fluid-filled blisters, often on the neck, chest, face, stomach, and legs. The infection is often accompanied by lymphadenopathy (enlargement of the lymph nodes), fever, sore throat, and headache. Often, the accompanying symptoms are much more of an inconvenience than the actual skin blisters and rash.

Each blister contains infectious virus particles (virions). Close contact, particularly abrasive contact as found in contact sports, causes the infected blisters to burst and pass the infection along. Autoinoculation (self-infection) can occur through self-contact, leading to infection at multiple sites on the body.

Herpes gladiatorum symptoms may last up to a few weeks, and if they occur during the first outbreak, they can be more pronounced. In recurrences of the ailment, symptoms are milder, even if lesions still tend to occur. With recurrent infections scabs may form at 3 days yet the lesions are still considered infectious up until 6.4 days after starting oral antiviral medications. Healing takes place without leaving scars. It is possible that the condition evolves asymptomatically and sores are never present.

== Causes ==
Herpes gladiatorum is a skin infection primarily caused by the herpes simplex virus. The virus infects the cells in the epidermal layer of the skin. The initial viral replication occurs at the entry site in the skin or mucous membrane.

The infections caused by a HSV Type 1 virus may be primary or recurrent. Studies show that even though most of the individuals who are exposed to the virus get infected, only 10% from them will develop sores as well. These types of sores appear within two to twenty days after exposure and usually do not last longer than ten days. Primary infections usually heal completely without leaving scars but the virus that caused the infection in the first place remains in the body in a latent state. This is the reason why most of the people experience recurrences even after the condition is taken care of. The virus moves to the nerve cells from where it can reactivate. Once the condition has recurred, it is normally a mild infection. The infection may be triggered by several external factors such as sun exposure or trauma.

Infection with either type of the HSV viruses occurs in the following way: First, the virus comes in contact with damaged skin, and then it goes to the nuclei of the cells and reproduces or replicates. The blisters and ulcers formed on the skin are a result of the destruction of infected cells. In its latent form, the virus does not reproduce or replicate until recurrence is triggered by different factors.

== Pathophysiology ==
Herpes gladiatorum is transmitted by direct contact with skin lesions caused by a herpes simplex virus. This is the main reason why the condition is often found in wrestlers. It is believed that the virus may be transmitted through infected wrestlers' mats, but this is still subject of research since the virus cannot live long enough outside the body in order to be able to cause an infection. Direct contact with an infected person or infected secretions is undoubtedly the main way in which this virus may be transmitted.

It is also believed that wearing abrasive clothing may increase the chances to get infected with this type of virus. Shirts made of polyester and cotton may cause frictions that lead to small breaks in the skin which makes it easier to contract the infection. Studies in which athletes were wearing 100% cotton shirts showed a decrease in the number of herpes gladiatorum cases.

The spread is facilitated when a sore is present but it can happen in its absence as well. The patients may know that the virus is present on the skin when they experience the so-called "prodromal symptoms". These include itching or tingling on the skin, right before the blisters or lesions appear. The virus may spread since the first symptoms appear until lesions are completely healed. The incubation period is situated between 3 and 14 days. This means that a person will experience the symptoms within 14 days after he or she contracted the infection. This type of virus may be transmitted even if the symptoms are not yet present. Some individuals can have very mild symptoms that may not be taken as herpes symptoms and the patient may not recognize them. The asymptomatic transmission occurs when the infection is spread between outbreaks.

=== Similar infections ===
Herpes gladiatorum is only caused by the herpes simplex virus. Shingles, also manifesting as skin rashes with blisters, is caused by a different virus, herpes zoster. Other agents may cause skin infections, for example ringworm is primarily due to the fungal dermatophyte, T. tonsurans. Impetigo, cellulitis, folliculitis and carbuncles are usually due to Staphylococcus aureus or Beta-hemolytic streptococcus bacteria. These less common forms can be potentially more serious. Anti-viral treatments will not have an effect in non-viral cases. Bacterial infections must be treated with antibiotics and fungal infections with anti-fungal medication.

== Prevention ==
Key measures to prevent outbreaks of the disease are maintaining hygiene standards and using screening to exclude persons with suspicious infections from engaging in contact sports. A skin check performed before practice or competition takes place can identify individuals who should be evaluated, and if necessary treated by a healthcare professional. In certain situations, i.e. participating in wrestling camps, consider placing participants on valacyclovir 1GM daily for the duration of camp. One ten year study showed an 89.5% reduction in outbreaks and probable prevention of contracting the virus. Medication must be started 5 days before participation to ensure proper concentrations exist.

== Treatment ==
Herpes outbreaks should be treated with antiviral medications like Acyclovir, Valacyclovir, or Famcyclovir, each of which is available in tablet form.

Oral antiviral medication is often used as a prophylactic to suppress or prevent outbreaks from occurring. The recommended dosage for suppression therapy for recurrent outbreaks is 1,000 mg of valacyclovir once a day or 400 mg Acyclovir taken twice a day. In addition to preventing outbreaks, these medications greatly reduce the chance of infecting someone while the patient is not having an outbreak.

Often, people have regular outbreaks of anywhere from 1 to 10 times per year, but stress (because the virus lies next to the nerve cells), or a weakened immune system due to a temporary or permanent illness can also spark outbreaks. Some people become infected but fail to ever have a single outbreak, although they remain carriers of the virus and can pass the disease on to an uninfected person through asymptomatic shedding (when the virus is active on the skin but rashes or blisters do not appear).

The use of antiviral medications has been shown to be effective in preventing acquisition of the herpes virus. Specific usage of these agents focus on wrestling camps where intense contact between individuals occurs on a daily basis over several weeks. They have also been used for large outbreaks during seasonal competition, but further research needs to be performed to verify efficacy.

== See also ==
- Herpes simplex
- List of cutaneous conditions
