= Heinrich Koebner =

Heinrich Köbner (1838–1904)

Heinrich Koebner (German spelling Köbner; 2 December 1838 – 3 September 1904) was a German-Jewish dermatologist born in Breslau.

He studied medicine in Berlin, earning his doctorate in 1859 at Breslau. Afterwards he performed hospital duties in Vienna under Ferdinand von Hebra (1816–1880) and in Paris with Alfred Hardy (1811–1893). In 1876 he became director of the policlinic for syphilis and diseases of the skin at the University of Breslau. In 1884 he established a new policlinic in Berlin, where he provided classes for physicians.

== Koebner phenomenon ==
Koebner was a renowned dermatologist known for his research of psoriasis, epidermolysis bullosa simplex and various fungal disorders. He is best known for the eponymous "Koebner phenomenon", also known as isomorphic phenomenon. The Koebner phenomenon is the development of isomorphic pathologic lesions in the traumatized "uninvolved skin" of persons who have cutaneous diseases such as psoriasis. In other words, if a person has psoriasis, an injury is followed by new psoriatic lesions on the injured but otherwise normal (formerly non-psoriatic) skin, and these new lesions are similar to those of the diseased (originally psoriatic) skin in a clinical and histopathological sense.

In 1872, Koebner explained this phenomenon to the Silesian Society for National Culture, by presenting a case in which years after the appearance of an isolated plaque of psoriasis, several "traumatic" events in various areas of the body (tattoos, animal bite, suppuration from lymphadenitis, et al.) caused new outbreaks of psoriasis at exactly the same locations, in the same shape as the injured skin.

"Koebnerization" may also occur with skin disorders such as vitiligo and lichen planus. The following terms are derived from Koebner's name, and are still used by modern dermatologists:

- "koebnerization": word to describe the isomorphic process taking place.
- "reverse koebnerization": is seen when an area of psoriasis clears; an isomorphic nonresponse. Also referred to as the "Renbök phenomenon", with the term "Renbök" being the reverse spelling of "Köbner".
- "pseudo-koebnerization": is used to describe the spread of an infectious agent such as warts and molluscum contagiosum.
