= Herpes esophagitis =

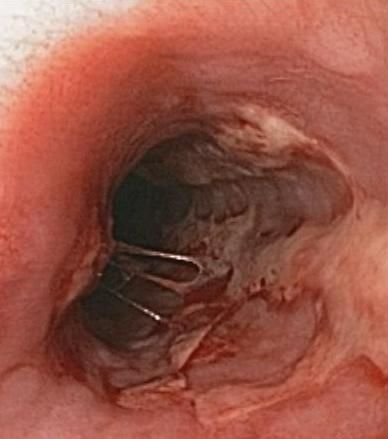
- Endoscopic image of Herpes esophagitis
- Specialty: Infectious disease, gastroenterology

Herpes esophagitis is a viral infection of the esophagus caused by Herpes simplex virus (HSV).

While the disease most often occurs in immunocompromised patients, including post-chemotherapy, immunosuppression with organ transplants and in AIDS, herpes esophagitis can also occur in immunocompetent individuals.

== Signs and symptoms ==
People with herpes esophagitis experience pain with eating and trouble swallowing. Other symptoms can include food impaction, hiccups, weight loss, fever, and on rare occasions upper gastrointestinal bleeding as noted in the image above and tracheoesophageal fistula. Frequently one can see herpetiform lesions in the mouth and lips.

== Diagnosis ==
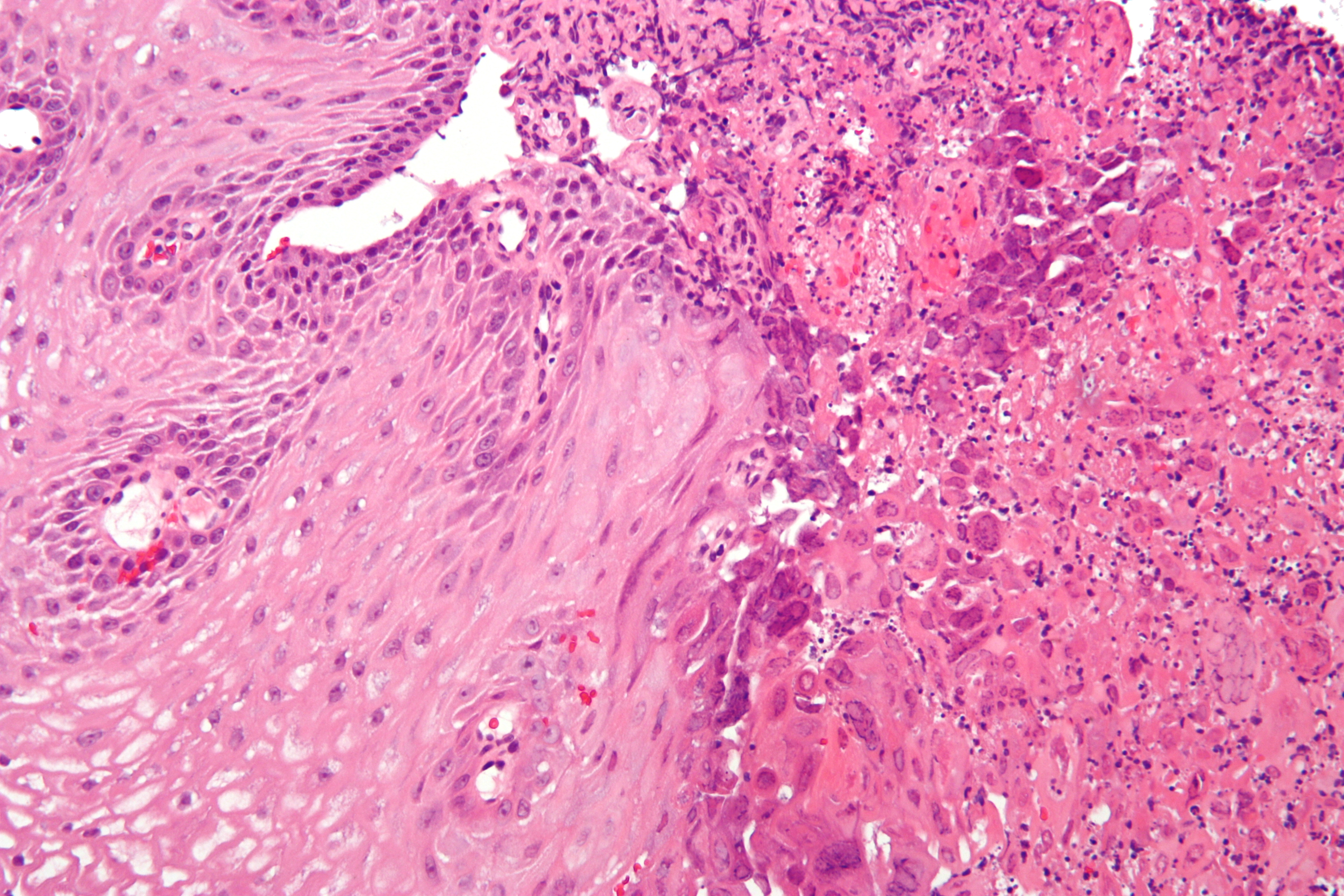
Micrograph of an esophageal biopsy showing herpes eosphagitis, with the characteristic nuclear changes (nuclear moulding, chromatin clumping at the nuclear membrane (margination) and multinucleation). H&E stain.

Upper Endoscopy often reveals ulcers throughout the esophagus with intervening normal-appearing mucosa. In severe cases the ulcers can coalesce and on rare occasions have a black appearance known as black esophagus. While the diagnosis of herpes esophagitis can be inferred clinically it can only be accurately diagnosed through endoscopically obtained biopsies with microscopic evaluation by a pathologist finding the appropriate inclusion bodies and diagnostic immunochemical staining. False negative findings may occur if biopsies are taken from the ulcer rather than from the margin of the ulcer as the inclusion particles are to be found in viable epithelial cells. Viral tissue culture represents the most accurate means of diagnosing the precise cause.

=== Differential diagnosis ===
CMV, VZV as well as HIV infections of the esophagus can have a similar presentation. Tissue culture is the most accurate means of distinguishing between the different viral causes. Caustic esophagitis, pill-induced esophagitis as well as yeast esophagitis can have a similar clinical presentation.

== Prevention ==
Herpes simplex virus is commonly found in humans, yet uncommonly results in systemic manifestations. Suppression of HIV with antiretroviral medications, careful monitoring of immunosuppressive medications are important means of prevention. Antiviral prophylaxis such as daily acyclovir in immunocompromised individuals may be considered.

== Treatment ==
Antivirals such as acyclovir, famciclovir, or valacyclovir may be used. Intravenous acyclovir is reserved for individuals who cannot swallow due to the pain, individuals with other systemic manifestations of herpes or severely immunocompromised individuals.
