= Herpetic gingivostomatitis =

Inflammation of the mouth, lips, and gums, often due to herpes infection

Gingivostomatitis
- Other names: Primary herpetic gingivostomatitis, orolabial herpes
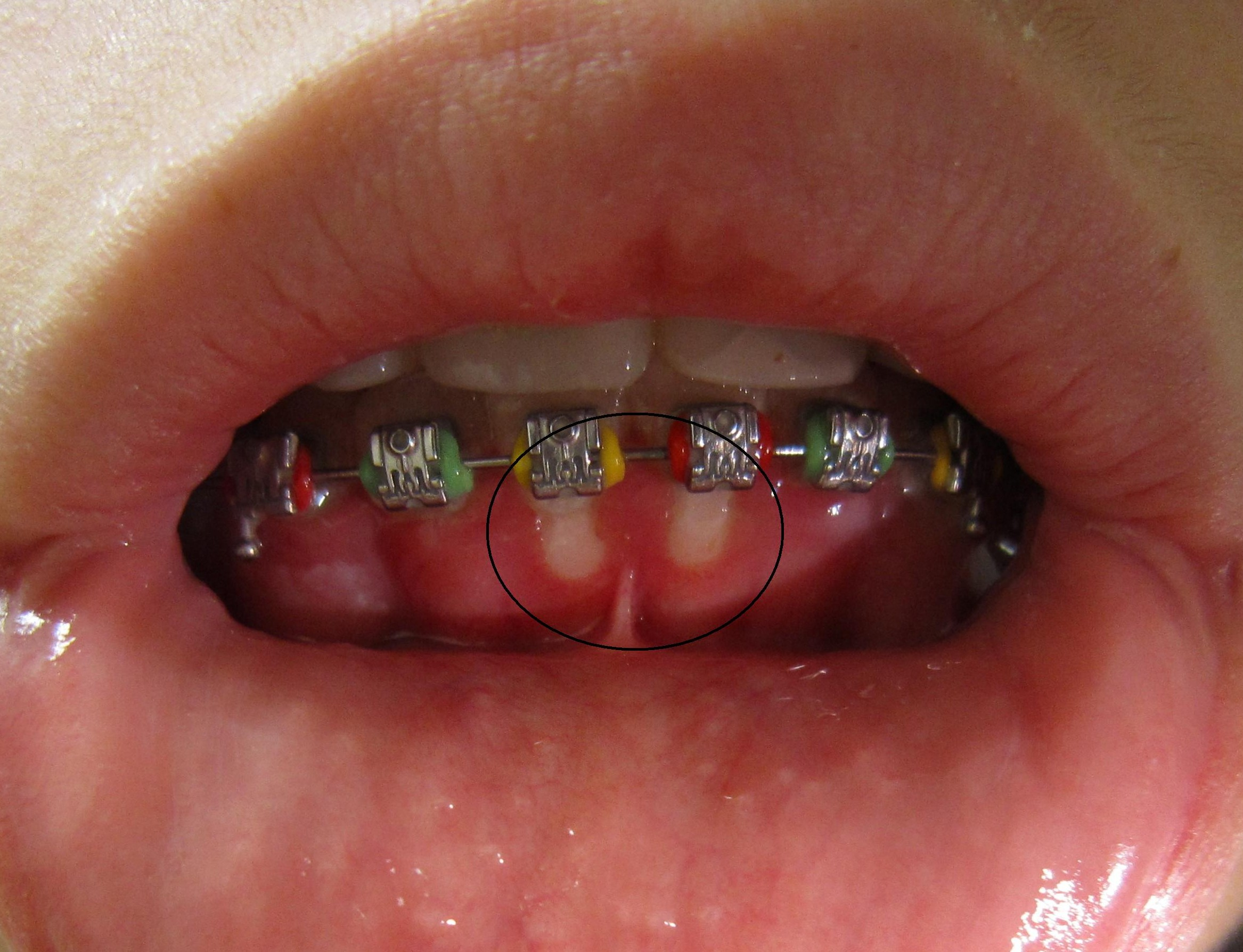
- Specialty: Infectious disease

Gingivostomatitis is a combination of gingivitis and stomatitis, or an inflammation of the oral mucosa and gingiva. Herpetic gingivostomatitis is often the initial presentation during the first ("primary") herpes simplex infection. It is of greater severity than herpes labialis (cold sores) which is often the subsequent presentations. Primary herpetic gingivostomatitis is the most common viral infection of the mouth.

Primary herpetic gingivostomatitis (PHGS) represents the clinically apparent pattern of primary herpes simplex virus (HSV) infection, since the vast majority of other primary infections are symptomless. PHGS is caused predominantly by HSV-1 and affects mainly children. Prodromal symptoms, such as fever, anorexia, irritability, malaise and headache, may occur in advance of disease. The disease presents as numerous pin-head vesicles, which rupture rapidly to form painful irregular ulcerations covered by yellow–grey membranes. Sub-mandibular lymphadenitis, halitosis and refusal to drink are usual concomitant findings.

== Signs and symptoms ==
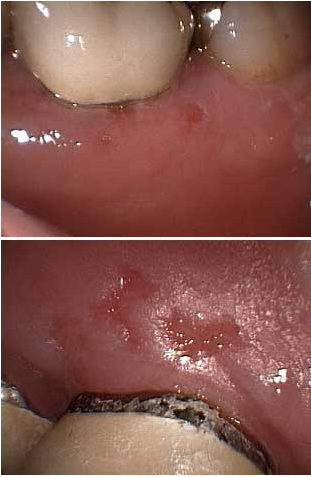
Herpes lesions on the gingiva.

The symptoms can be mild or severe and may include:

- Not able to chew or swallow
- Sores on the inside of the cheeks or gums
- Fever
- General discomfort, uneasiness, or ill feeling
- Very sore mouth with no desire to eat
- Halitosis (bad breath)

== Causes ==
Herpetic gingivostomatitis is an infection caused by the herpes simplex virus (HSV). The HSV is a double-stranded DNA virus categorised into two types; HSV-1 and HSV-2. HSV-1 is predominantly responsible for oral, facial and ocular infections whereas HSV-2 is responsible for most genital and cutaneous lower herpetic lesions. Both HSV-1, and HSV-2 can be the cause of herpetic gingivostomatitis, although HSV-1 is the source of infection in around 90% of cases.

Herpetic gingivostomatitis infections can present as acute or recurrent. Acute infection refers to the first invasion of the virus, and recurrent is when reactivation of the latent virus occurs. Acute herpetic gingivostomatitis primarily occurs in children, particularly of those under the age of six years old.

On external surfaces the virus is short lived, however it is extremely contagious. Most people acquire the virus via direct contact, it can enter the body by disrupting the integrity of skin, mucous membranes or enter via infected secretions such as saliva. The virus replicates once it has penetrated the epithelial cell, then it travels to the corresponding nerve ganglion (i.e. trigeminal ganglion) via sensory nerves endings. At the nerve ganglion the virus enters a latent phase and remains dormant until it is reactivated. Reactivation can be spontaneous or stimulated by a number of factors such as: reinfection by direct effect of stimuli, immunosuppression, ultraviolet light, febrile illnesses and stress.

=== Risk factors ===
Age: Primary herpetic gingivostomatitis is common in children from 6 months to 5 years old. This virus is also common in young adults aged around 20–25.

Immune system: The prevalence and severity of the disease is dependent on the host's immune response and the virulence of the virus.

Environment: As this virus is very contagious it has the potential to spread quickly in enclosed environments e.g. nurseries and orphanages.

Epidemiology: Those living in developing countries are at a higher risk of HSV-1 infection. It has been reported that around a 1/3rd of children living in developing countries are HSV-1 positive by 5 years old and 70-80% of the population are infected by the age of adolescence. In developed countries only 20% of children are infected at the age of 5 and there is no significant increase in disease prevalence until 20–40 years old where the percentage of infected individuals ranges from 40-60%

Socio-economic status: Those with a lower income have a higher risk of HSV-1 infection at a younger age.

Race: Studies have demonstrated that in the USA 35% of African Americans by the age of 5 have presented with the disease whereas only 18% of White Americans are affected.

== Pathophysiology ==
Herpetic gingivostomatitis originates from a primary infection of HSV-1. The series of events that take place during this infection include replication of the herpes simplex virus, cell lysis and finally, destruction of the mucosal tissue.

HSV-1 can very easily enter and replicate within epidermal and dermal cells through skin or mucosal surfaces which have abrasions. This results in numerous small vesicles or blisters of up to 1-2mm on the oral mucosa, erosions on the lips, eventual hemorrhagic crusting and even ulceration, covered by a yellowish-grey pseudomembrane, surrounded by an erythematous halo.

As the virus continues to replicate and incolulate in great amounts, it can enter autonomic or sensory ganglia, where it travels within axons to reach ganglionic nerve bodies. HSV-1 most commonly infects the trigeminal ganglia, where it remains latent. If reactivated, it presents as herpes labialis, also known as cold sores.

== Diagnosis ==
=== Histopathology ===
The histological appearance of a herpetic infection on the mucosa includes degeneration of stratified squamous epithelial cells, the loss of intercellular connections and inflammatory infiltrate around the capillaries of the dermis layer. An intact herpetic vesicle presents as an intraepithelial blister histologically. This vesicle is caused by rupture and distension of the virally epithelial cells by intracellular oedema and coalescence of disrupted cells.

Rupturing of the infected cells cause a great number of viral particles to be released, rendering them the ability to affect adjacent epithelial cells and even the sensory axons of the trigeminal nerve. Histologically, these infected cells have an eosinophilic cytoplasm and large, pale vesicular nuclei, appearing swollen under the microscope. The cytoplasms of the infected cells fuse, collectively forming giant cells with many nuclei. The balloon cells and multi-nucleated giant cells can often be identified in smears taken from an intact vesicle or from one which has been recently ruptured.

The lamina propria shows a variable inflammatory infiltrate, the density of which depends on the stage and severity of the disease, and inflammatory cells also extend into the epithelium.

Cowdry type A bodies are intranuclear inclusion bodies visible under light microscopy. They show electron dense glycoproteins and viral capsids. Both Cowdry type A bodies can both be found in varicella zoster and herpetic gingivostomatitis, making it impossible to distinguish between both eosinophilic bodies. One way to distinguish between the herpes virus (and hence herpetic gingivostomatitis) and varicella virus is by direct immunohistochemistry using fluorescent antibodies.

=== Differential diagnosis ===
Diagnosis of HG is very much clinically based. Therefore, it is imperative to rule out other diseases that present similarly, bearing in mind the past medical history of the patient.

Some differential diagnoses to bear in mind when considering herpetic gingivostomatitis are:

1. Teething in infants: A study mentioned that "primary tooth eruption begins at about the time that infants are losing maternal antibody protection against the herpes virus. Also, reports on teething difficulties have recorded symptoms which are remarkably consistent with primary oral herpetic infection such as fever, irritability, sleeplessness, and difficulty with eating." Another study highlighted that "younger infants with higher residual levels of antibodies would experience milder infections and these would be more likely to go unrecognized or be dismissed as teething difficulty."
2. Herpangina: It is a disease that is caused by the Coxackie A virus rather than a herpes virus. In herpangina, ulcers are usually isolated to the soft palate and anterior pillar of the mouth. In herpetic gingivostomatitis, lesions can be found in these locations, but they are almost always accompanied by ulcerations on the gums, lips, tongue or buccal mucosa and/or by hyperemia, hypertrophy or hemorrhage of the gums.
3. Hand Foot and Mouth Disease: Similar to herpangina, hand foot and mouth disease occurs predominantly in children. It is caused by Coxsackie A and B virus, and lesions or blisters are found bilaterally on the hands, feet and mouth of the patient.
4. Oral candidiasis: Also known as thrush, herpetic gingivostomatitis can often be differentiated from these microorganism/bacterial causing white plaques on the palate, buccal mucosa, tongue, oropharynx etc.
5. Apthous stomatitis: They are commonly known as apthous ulcers, and are characterized by grey membranes and peripheral erythema. Lesions/ulcers for herpetic gingivostomatitis may also be found on the palate and keratinzied gingivae hence aphthous ulcers can be ruled out.
6. Stevens–Johnson syndrome: Stevens–Johnson syndrome is characterized by early symptoms of malaise and fever, and shortly after that erythema, purpura and plaques on the skin, which often progresses to epidermal necrosis and sloughing in extreme cases.
7. Infectious mononucleosis - Infectious Mononucleosis presents with a high fever and lymphadenopathy, which is may or may not be presented in the symptoms of herpetic gingivostomatitis. However, upon closer oral examination, ulceration, petechiae and occasional gingivostomatitis may be spotted.
8. Behcet's syndrome - It is an inflammatory disorder in which the presenting symptoms are recurrent aphthous ulcers, and severe cases may result in the patient having genital lesions, gastro-intestinal problems, and even arthritis.
9. Varicella - Small ulcers on the back of the oral cavity and vesicular lesions on the scalp and trunk are common for Varicella. It is ruled out as the location of the infections are unilateral, unlike herpetic gingivostomatitis which is bilateral.

== Treatment ==
The aim of treatment is mostly supportive such as pain control, duration of symptoms, viral shedding and in some cases, preventing outbreak. Antibiotics are rarely prescribed to treat bacterial superinfection of oral lesions. Antiviral drugs are used to treat herpetic gingivostomatitis such as aciclovir, valaciclovir, famciclovir, and in resistance cases foscarnet can be used. Treatment does not prevent recurrence. Most individuals who are immunocompetent will fully recover from recurrent herpes labialis in 7 to 14 days. However treatment with antipyretics, oral anaesthetics and analgesics is often needed. In severe cases of herpetic gingivostomatitis, mouth rinses are useful in relieving oral discomfort. These contain topical anaesthetic agents such as lidocaine and diphenhydramine as well as coating agents such as magnesium-containing antacids. In order to prevent dehydration, oral fluid intake is encouraged. Other treatment options include good oral hygiene and gentle debridement of the mouth.

A number of precautions can be taken to reduce the risk of infection of HSV including;

- Avoid saliva exchange with those with active HSV
- Avoid direct contact with active lesions (if contact occurred, ensure area is washed adequately)
- Those with recurrent HSV can apply sunscreen lip balm as ultraviolet light is a stimulus for the infection

== See also ==
- Acute necrotizing ulcerative gingivitis
