= Scrumpox =

Scrumpox may refer to:

- Herpes gladiatorum
- Impetigo
