= Viral disease =

Animal or plant disease resulting from a viral infection

- Other names: Viral infection
- Types of viral diseases
- Specialty: Infectious disease
- Causes: Virus
- Medication: Antiviral drugs

A viral disease (or viral infection) occurs when an organism's body is invaded by pathogenic viruses, and infectious virus particles (virions) attach to and enter susceptible cells. Virosis is a disease or infection caused by a virus.

Examples include the common cold, gastroenteritis, COVID-19, the flu, and rabies.

== Structural characteristics ==
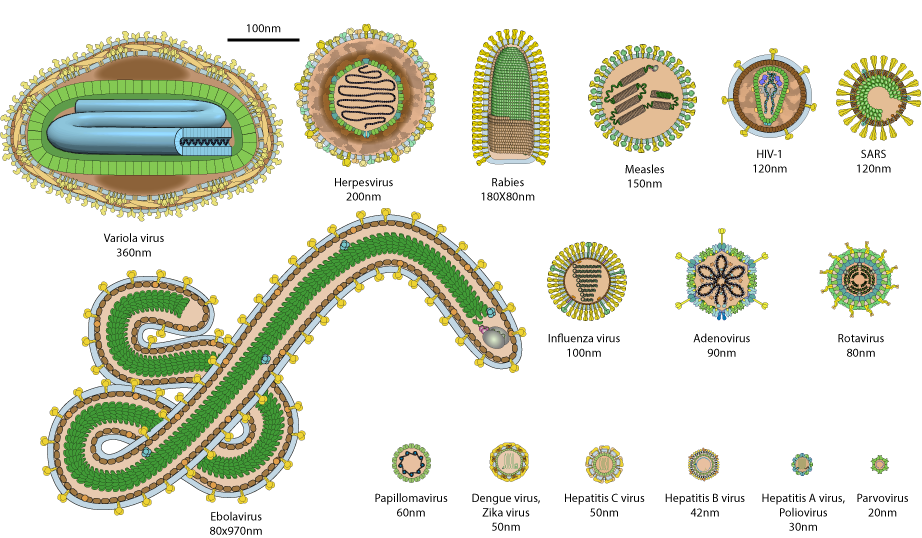
Virions of some of the most common human viruses with their relative size. Nucleic acids are not to scale. SARS stands for SARS-CoV-1 or COVID-19, variola viruses for smallpox.

Basic structural characteristics, such as genome type, virion shape and replication site, generally share the same features among virus species within the same family.

- Double-stranded DNA families: three are non-enveloped (Adenoviridae, Papillomaviridae and Polyomaviridae) and two are enveloped (Herpesviridae and Poxviridae). All of the non-enveloped families have icosahedral capsids.
- Partly double-stranded DNA viruses: Hepadnaviridae. These viruses are enveloped.
- One family of single-stranded DNA viruses infects humans: Parvoviridae. These viruses are non-enveloped.
- Positive single-stranded RNA families: three non-enveloped (Astroviridae, Caliciviridae and Picornaviridae) and four enveloped (Coronaviridae, Flaviviridae, Retroviridae and Togaviridae). All the non-enveloped families have icosahedral nucleocapsids.
- Negative single-stranded RNA families: Arenaviridae, Bunyaviridae, Filoviridae, Orthomyxoviridae, Paramyxoviridae and Rhabdoviridae. All are enveloped with helical nucleocapsids.
- Double-stranded RNA genome: Reoviridae.
- The Hepatitis D virus has not yet been assigned to a family, but is clearly distinct from the other families infecting humans.
- Viruses known to infect humans that have not been associated with disease: the family Anelloviridae and the genus Dependovirus. Both of these taxa are non-enveloped single-stranded DNA viruses.

=== Pragmatic rules ===
Human-infecting virus families offer rules that may assist physicians and medical microbiologists/virologists.

As a general rule, DNA viruses replicate within the cell nucleus while RNA viruses replicate within the cytoplasm. Exceptions are known to this rule: poxviruses replicate within the cytoplasm and orthomyxoviruses and hepatitis D virus (RNA viruses) replicate within the nucleus.

- Segmented genomes: Bunyaviridae, Orthomyxoviridae, Arenaviridae, and Reoviridae (acronym BOAR). All are RNA viruses.
- Viruses transmitted almost exclusively by arthropods: Bunyavirus, Flavivirus, and Togavirus. Some Reoviruses are transmitted from arthropod vectors. All are RNA viruses.
- One family of enveloped viruses causes gastroenteritis (Coronaviridae). All other viruses associated with gastroenteritis are non-enveloped.

=== Baltimore group ===
This group of analysts defined multiple categories of virus. Groups:

- I - dsDNA
- II - ssDNA
- III - dsRNA
- IV - positive-sense ssRNA
- V - negative-sense ssRNA
- VI - ssRNA-RT
- VII - dsDNA-RT

Clinically important virus families and species with characteristics
Family	Baltimore group	Important species	Envelopment
Adenoviridae	I	Adenovirus	N
Herpesviridae	I	Herpes simplex, type 1, Herpes simplex, type 2, Varicella-zoster virus, Epstein–Barr virus, Human cytomegalovirus, Human herpesvirus, type 8	Y
Papillomaviridae	I	Human papillomavirus	N
Polyomaviridae	I	BK virus, JC virus	N
Poxviridae	I	smallpox virus,monkeypox virus	Y
Parvoviridae	II	Parvovirus B19	N
Reoviridae	III	Rotavirus, Orbivirus, Coltivirus, Banna virus	N
Astroviridae	IV	Human astrovirus	N
Caliciviridae	IV	Norwalk virus	N
Coronaviridae	IV	Human coronavirus 229E, Human coronavirus NL63, Human coronavirus OC43, Human coronavirus HKU1, Middle East respiratory syndrome-related coronavirus, Severe acute respiratory syndrome coronavirus, Severe acute respiratory syndrome coronavirus 2	Y
Flaviviridae	IV	yellow fever virus, dengue virus, West Nile virus,, Japanese encephalitis virus,Saint Louis encephalitis virus,TBE virus, Zika virus	Y
Hepaciviridae	IV	Hepatitis C virus	Y
Hepeviridae	IV	Hepatitis E virus	N
Matonaviridae	IV	Rubella virus	Y
Picornaviridae	IV	coxsackievirus,echovirus,hepatitis A virus,poliovirus,rhinovirus	N
Arenaviridae	V	Lassa virus	Y
Bunyaviridae	V	Crimean-Congo hemorrhagic fever virus, Hantaan virus,Rift Valley fever virus	Y
Filoviridae	V	Ebola virus, Marburg virus	Y
Orthomyxoviridae	V	Influenza virus	Y
Paramyxoviridae	V	Hendra virus,Measles virus,Mumps virus,Nipah virus,Parainfluenza virus	Y
Pneumoviridae	V	Respiratory syncytial virus,human metapneumovirus	Y
Rhabdoviridae	V	Rabies virus	Y
Kolmioviridae	V	Hepatitis D virus	Y
Retroviridae	VI	HIV,HTLV-1,HTLV-2	Y
Hepadnaviridae	VII	Hepatitis B virus	Y

=== Clinical characteristics ===
The clinical characteristics of viruses may differ substantially among species within the same family:

Type	Family	Transmission	Diseases	Treatment	Prevention
Adenovirus	Adenoviridae	droplet contact; fecal-oral; venereal; direct eye contact	gastroenteritis; keratoconjunctivitis; pharyngitis; pharyngoconjunctival fever	None	Adenovirus vaccine; hand washing; covering mouth when coughing or sneezing; avoiding close contact with the sick
Coxsackievirus	Picornaviridae	fecal-oral; respiratory droplet contact	Hand, foot and mouth disease; pleurodynia; aseptic meningitis; pericarditis; myocarditis	None	hand washing; covering mouth when coughing/sneezing; avoiding contaminated food/water; improved sanitation
Cytomegalovirus	Herpesviridae	vertical transmission; bodily fluids	infectious mononucleosis; Cytomegalic inclusion disease; Premature birth; liver, lung and spleen diseases in the newborn; Small size at birth; Small head size; congenital seizures in the newborn	ganciclovir; cidofovir; foscarnet	hand washing; avoid sharing food and drinks with others; safe sex
Epstein–Barr virus	Herpesviridae	saliva	infectious mononucleosis; Burkitt's lymphoma; Hodgkin's lymphoma; nasopharyngeal carcinoma	None	avoiding close contact with the sick
Hepatitis A virus	Picornaviridae	fecal-oral	acute hepatitis	Immunoglobulin (post-exposure prophylaxis)	Hepatitis A vaccine; avoiding contaminated food/water; improved sanitation
Hepatitis B virus	Hepadnaviridae	bodily fluids; Vertical and sexual	acute hepatitis; chronic hepatitis; hepatic cirrhosis; hepatocellular carcinoma	Lamivudine; immunoglobulin; Adefovir; Entecavir; Pegylated interferon alfa-2	Hepatitis B vaccine; immunoglobulin (perinatal and post-exposure prophylaxis); avoiding shared needles/syringes; safe sex
Hepatitis C virus	Hepaciviridae	blood; sexual contact	acute hepatitis; chronic hepatitis; hepatic cirrhosis; hepatocellular carcinoma	Ribavirin; Pegylated interferon alfa-2	avoiding shared needles/syringes; safe sex
Herpes simplex virus, type 1	Herpesviridae	direct contact; saliva	herpes labialis, cold sores – can recur by latency; gingivostomatitis in children; tonsillitis & pharyngitis in adults; keratoconjunctivitis	acyclovir; famciclovir; foscarnet; penciclovir	avoiding close contact with lesions; safe sex
Herpes simplex virus, type 2	Herpesviridae	sexual contact; vertical transmission	Skin vesicles, mucosal ulcers, Oral and/or genital Can be latent; Aseptic meningitis	acyclovir; famciclovir; foscarnet; penciclovir; cidofovir	avoiding close contact with lesions; safe sex
HIV	Retroviridae	sexual contact; blood; breast milk; vertical transmission	AIDS	HAART, such as protease inhibitors and reverse-transcriptase inhibitors	zidovudine (perinatally); blood product screening; safe sex; avoiding shared needles/syringes
Human coronavirus 229E (HCoV-229E)	Coronaviridae	droplet contact; fomites	common cold; pneumonia; bronchiolitis		
Human coronavirus NL63 (HCoV-NL63)	Coronaviridae	droplet contact	common cold; rhinitis; bronchitis; bronchiolitis; pneumonia; croup		
Human coronavirus OC43 (HCoV-OC43)	Coronaviridae		common cold; pneumonia		
Human coronavirus HKU1 (HCoV-HKU1)	Coronaviridae		common cold; pneumonia; bronchiolitis		
Human herpesvirus, type 8	Herpesviridae	Saliva; Sexual	Kaposi sarcoma; multicentric Castleman disease; primary effusion lymphoma	many in evaluation-stage	avoid close contact with lesions; safe sex
Human papillomavirus	Papillomaviridae	direct contact; sexual contact; vertical transmission	(common, flat, plantar and anogenital warts, laryngeal papillomas, epidermodysplasia verruciformis); Malignancies for some species (cervical carcinoma, squamous cell carcinomas)	liquid nitrogen; laser vaporization; cytotoxic chemicals; interferon; cidofovir	HPV vaccine; avoiding close contact with lesions; safe sex
Influenza virus	Orthomyxoviridae	droplet contact	influenza; (Reye syndrome)	amantadine; rimantadine; zanamivir; oseltamivir	influenza vaccine; amantadine; rimantadine; hand washing; covering mouth when coughing/sneezing; avoiding close contact with the sick
Measles virus	Paramyxoviridae	droplet contact	measles; postinfectious encephalomyelitis	None	MMR vaccine; quarantining the sick; avoiding contact with the sick
Middle East respiratory syndrome-related coronavirus (MERS-CoV)	Coronaviridae	close human contact	Middle East respiratory syndrome (MERS)		
Mumps virus	Paramyxoviridae	droplet contact	mumps	None	MMR vaccine; avoiding close contact with the sick
Parainfluenza virus	Paramyxoviridae	droplet contact	croup; pneumonia; bronchiolitis; common cold	None	hand washing; covering mouth when coughing/sneezing
Poliovirus	Picornaviridae	fecal-oral	poliomyelitis	None	Polio vaccine; avoiding contaminated food and water; improved sanitation
Rabies virus	Rhabdoviridae	animal bite; droplet contact	rabies (fatal encephalitis)	Post-exposure prophylaxis	rabies vaccine; avoiding rabid animals
Respiratory syncytial virus	Pneumoviridae	droplet contact; hand to mouth	bronchiolitis; pneumonia; influenza-like syndrome; severe bronchiolitis with pneumonia	(ribavirin)	hand washing; avoiding close contact with the sick; palivizumab in high risk individuals; covering mouth when coughing/sneezing
Rubella virus	Togaviridae	Respiratory droplet contact	congenital rubella; German measles	None	MMR vaccine; avoiding close contact with the sick
Severe acute respiratory syndrome coronavirus (SARS-CoV)	Coronaviridae	droplet contact	severe acute respiratory syndrome (SARS)		
Severe acute respiratory syndrome coronavirus 2 (SARS-CoV-2)	Coronaviridae	droplet contact	coronavirus disease 2019 (COVID-19)	Molnupiravir, Nirmatrelvir/ritonavir	hand washing; covering mouth when coughing or sneezing; social distancing
Varicella-zoster virus	Herpesviridae	droplet contact; direct contact	chickenpox; herpes zoster; Congenital varicella syndrome	Varicella: acyclovir; famciclovir; valacyclovir; Zoster: acyclovir; famciclovir	Varicella: varicella vaccine; varicella-zoster immunoglobulin; avoiding close contact with the sick; Zoster: vaccine; varicella-zoster immunoglobulin

== See also ==
- List of latent human viral infections
- Pathogenic bacteria
