= Koebner phenomenon =

Appearance of skin lesions on lines of trauma

Heinrich Köbner (1838–1904)

The Koebner phenomenon or Köbner phenomenon (UK: /ˈkɜːbnər/, US: /ˈkɛb-/), also called the Koebner response or the isomorphic response, attributed to Heinrich Köbner, is the appearance of skin lesions on lines of trauma. The Koebner phenomenon may result from either a linear exposure or irritation. Conditions demonstrating linear lesions after a linear exposure to a causative agent include: molluscum contagiosum, warts and toxicodendron dermatitis (a dermatitis caused by a genus of plants including poison ivy). Warts and molluscum contagiosum lesions can be spread in linear patterns by self-scratching ("auto-inoculation"). Toxicodendron dermatitis lesions are often linear from brushing up against the plant. Causes of the Koebner phenomenon that are secondary to scratching rather than an infective or chemical cause include vitiligo, psoriasis, lichen planus, lichen nitidus, pityriasis rubra pilaris, and keratosis follicularis (Darier disease).

== Definition ==
The Koebner phenomenon describes skin lesions which appear at the site of injury. It is seen in:

- Psoriasis
- Pityriasis rubra pilaris
- Lichen planus
- Flat warts
- Lichen nitidus
- Vitiligo
- Lichen sclerosus
- Elastosis perforans serpiginosa
- Kaposi sarcoma
- Necrobiosis lipoidica
- Lupus
- Juvenile Idiopathic Arthritis
- Still disease
- Cutaneous leishmaniasis
- Post kala azar dermal leishmaniasis
- Eruptive xanthomas
- Urticaria

A similar response occurs in pyoderma gangrenosum and Behcet's syndrome, and is referred to as pathergy.

Rarely Koebner phenomenon has been reported as a mechanism of acute myeloid leukemia dissemination.

Warts and molluscum contagiosum are often listed as causing a Koebner reaction, but this is by direct inoculation of viral particles.

The linear arrangement of skin lesions in the Koebner phenomenon can be contrasted to both lines of Blaschko and dermatomal distributions. Blaschko lines follow embryotic cell migration patterns and are seen in some mosaic genetic disorders such as incontinentia pigmenti and pigment mosaicism. Dermatomal distributions are lines on the skin surface following the distribution of spinal nerve roots. The rash caused by herpes zoster (Shingles) follows such dermatomal lines.

== History ==
The Koebner phenomenon was named after the rather eccentric but renowned German dermatologist Heinrich Koebner (1838–1904). Koebner is best known for his work in mycology. His intense nature is illustrated by the following: in a medical meeting, he proudly exhibited on his arms and chest three different fungus infections, which he had self-inoculated, in order to prove the infectiousness of the organisms he was studying. The Koebner phenomenon is the generalized term applied to his discovery that on psoriasis patients, new lesions often appear along lines of trauma.

== See also ==
- Renbök phenomenon

== Sources ==
- Crissey JT, Parish LC, Holubar KH. Historical Atlas of Dermatology and Dermatologists. New York: The Parthenon Publishing Group, 2002.
- Paller A, Mancini A. Hurwitz Clinical Pediatric Dermatology. Philadelphia: Elsevier Saunders, 2002.
