= Muller's morphs =

Hermann J. Muller (1890–1967), who was a 1946 Nobel Prize winner, coined the terms amorph, hypomorph, hypermorph, antimorph and neomorph to classify mutations based on their behaviour in various genetic situations, as well as gene interaction between themselves. These classifications are still widely used in Drosophila genetics to describe mutations. For a more general description of mutations, see mutation, and for a discussion of allele interactions, see dominance relationship.

Key: In the following sections, alleles are referred to as +=wildtype, m=mutant, Df=gene deletion, Dp=gene duplication. Phenotypes are compared with '>', meaning 'phenotype is more severe than'

== Loss of function ==
=== Amorph ===
Amorphic describes a mutation that causes complete loss of gene function. Amorph is sometimes used interchangeably with "genetic null". An amorphic mutation might cause complete loss of protein function by disrupting translation ("protein null") and/or preventing transcription ("RNA null").

An amorphic allele elicits the same phenotype when homozygous and when heterozygous to a chromosomal deletion or deficiency that disrupts the same gene. This relationship can be represented as follows:

m/m = m/Df

An amorphic allele is commonly recessive to its wildtype counterpart. It is possible for an amorph to be dominant if the gene in question is required in two copies to elicit a normal phenotype (i.e. haploinsufficient).

=== Hypomorph ===
Hypomorphic describes a mutation that causes a partial loss of gene function. A hypomorph is a reduction in gene function through reduced (protein, RNA) expression or reduced functional performance, but not a complete loss.

The phenotype of a hypomorph is more severe in trans to a deletion allele than when homozygous.

m/DF > m/m

Hypomorphs are usually recessive, but occasional alleles are dominant due to haploinsufficiency.

== Gain of function ==
=== Hypermorph ===
A hypermorphic mutation causes an increase in normal gene function. Hypermorphic alleles are gain of function alleles. A hypermorph can result from an increase in gene dose (a gene duplication), from increased mRNA or protein expression, or constitutive protein activity.

The phenotype of a hypermorph is worsened by increasing the wildtype gene dose, and is reduced by lowering wildtype gene dose.

m/Dp > m/+ > m/Df

=== Antimorph ===
Antimorphs are dominant mutations that act in opposition to normal gene activity. Antimorphs are also called dominant negative mutations.

Increasing wildtype gene function reduces the phenotypic severity of an antimorph, so the phenotype of an antimorph is worse when heterozygous than when in trans to a gene duplication.

m/m > m/Df > m/+ >>> +/Df > +/+

An antimorphic mutation might affect the function of a protein that acts as a dimer so that a dimer consisting of one normal and one mutated protein is no longer functional.

Antimorphs that surpass loss-of-function variants in the same gene in terms of their associated clinical severity are called PEAK variants (short for phenotype exceeding allelic knockout).

=== Neomorph ===
A neomorphic mutation causes a dominant gain of gene function that is different from the normal function. A neomorphic mutation can cause ectopic mRNA or protein expression, or new protein functions from altered protein structure.

Changing wildtype gene dose has no effect on the phenotype of a neomorph.

m/Df = m/+ = m/Dp

== Isomorph ==
After Muller's classification of gene mutation, an isomorph was described as a silent point mutant with identical gene expression as the original allele.

m/Df = m/Dp

Therefore, with respect to the relationship between the original and mutated genes, one cannot talk about the effects of dominance and/or recessiveness.

== Overview ==
Muller's classification of mutant alleles

Category	Alternative function
Wild type	Referent gene expression, full ("normal"), expression of parent allele
Amorph	Dysfunctional, with null expression
Hypomorph	Reduced, or partial reduced gene activity
Hypermorph	Increased or partial increased parent gene activity
Neomorph	Novel function, comparing with the initial, new property
Antimorph	Opposing, antagonizing, or interfering gene activity
Isomorph	Identical expression with original (parent) allele, mostly resulting from silent point mutations
