= Isomorphism (disambiguation) =

Isomorphism or isomorph may refer to:

- Isomorphism, in mathematics, logic, philosophy, and information theory, a mapping that preserves the structure of the mapped entities, in particular:
  - Graph isomorphism a mapping that preserves the edges and vertices of a graph
  - Group isomorphism a mapping that preserves the group structure
  - Order isomorphism a mapping that preserves the comparabilities of a partially ordered set.
  - Ring isomorphism a mapping that preserves both the additive and multiplicative structure of a ring
  - Isomorphism theorems theorems that assert that some homomorphisms involving quotients and subobjects are isomorphisms
- Isomorphism (sociology), a similarity of the processes or structure of one organization to those of another
- Isomorphism (crystallography), a similarity of crystal form
- Isomorphism (Gestalt psychology), a correspondence between a stimulus array and the brain state created by that stimulus
- Cybernetic isomorphism, a recursive property of viable systems, as defined in Stafford Beer's viable system model
- Isomorph (gene), a classification of gene mutation

== See also ==
- Isomorph Records, a British music label
- Isomorphic Labs, an artificial intelligence subsidiary of Alphabet Inc.
