= Whitlow (infection) =

Infection of the fingertip

- Other names: Felon
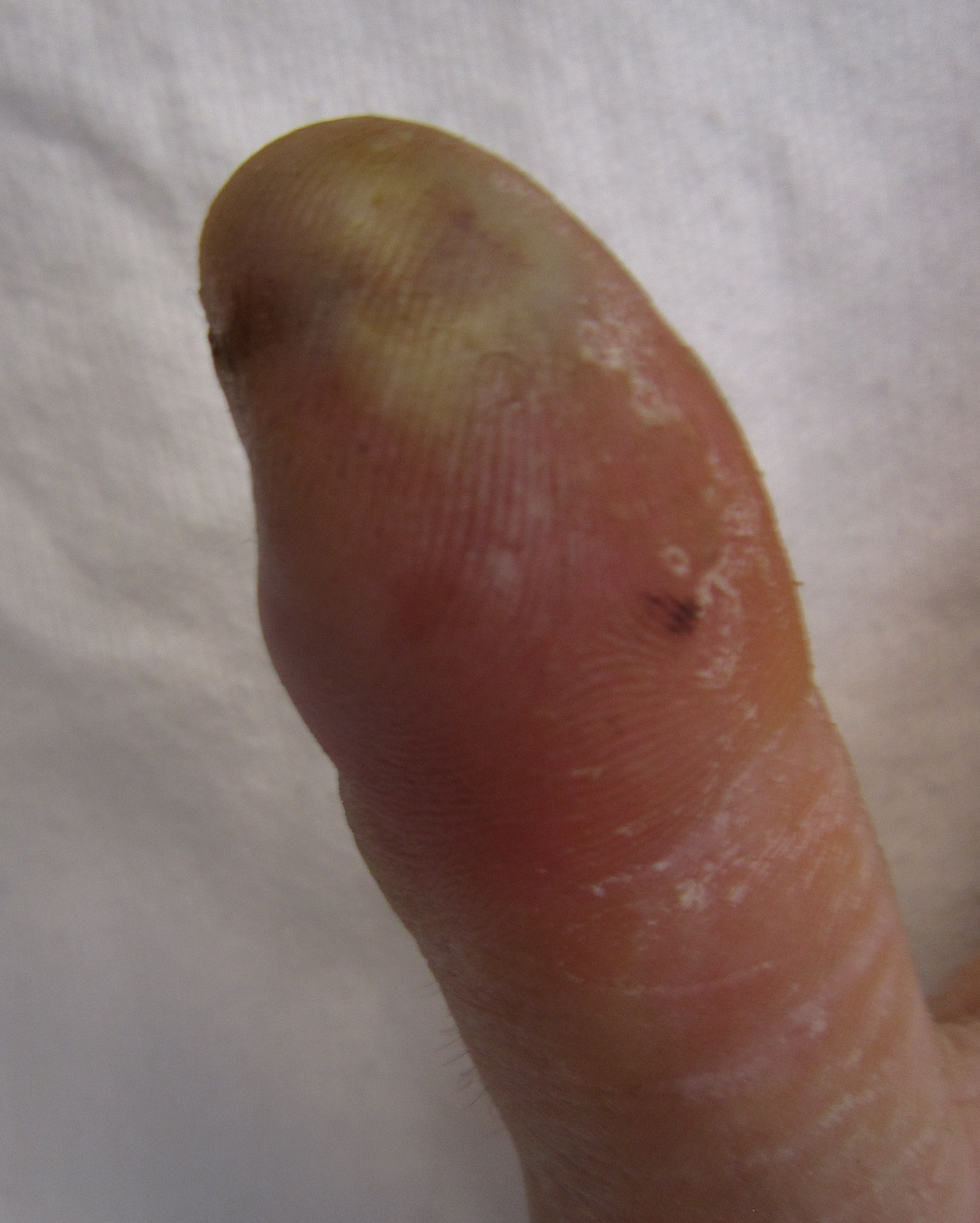
- An infection of the pulp space of the thumb
- Specialty: Infectious diseases

A whitlow or felon is an infection of the tip of the finger. (Note: The term whitlow derives from the Scandinavian whickflaw, combining a variant of quick (a sensitive spot) and flaw. Felon comes from the Old French, derived from the Latin root fel-, literally meaning "bile" and referring to the toxic content of the abscess.) Herpetic whitlow and melanotic whitlow (subungual melanoma) are subtypes that are not synonymous with the term felon. A felon is an "extremely painful abscess on the palmar aspect of the fingertip". Whitlow usually refers to herpetic whitlow, though it can also refer to melanotic whitlow (subungual melanoma), which somewhat resembles acral lentiginous melanoma. The terms whitlow and felon are also sometimes misapplied to paronychia, which is an infection of the tissue at the side or base of the nail. Felon presents clinically with a throbbing pain.
