= Lichen nitidus =

Human chronic inflammatory disease

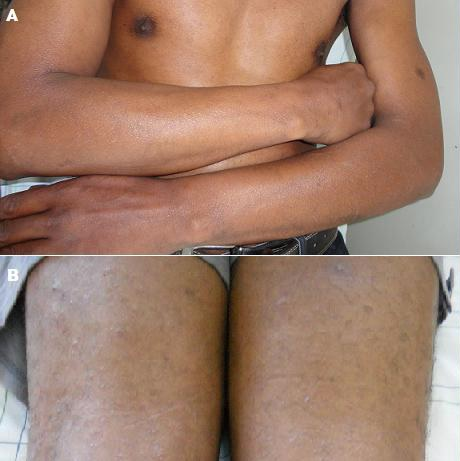
- Photography of lichen nitidus: A) Glistening forearm papules; B) Papular lesions of lower limbs
- Specialty: Dermatology

Lichen nitidus is a chronic inflammatory disease of unknown cause characterized by 1–2 mm, discrete and uniform, shiny, flat-topped papules or bumps. These bumps may be flesh-colored, reddish-brown, or white, and may appear as hypopigmented against dark skin. Occasionally, the skin may scale or flake, which can be induced by rubbing the surface of the papules. The disease usually affects children and young adults and is painless and usually nonpruritic, although chronic itching may occur in some cases. Lichen nitidus is not contagious, and typically goes away on its own without treatment. It is sometimes referred to by dermatologists as "mini lichen planus".

== Presentation ==
The papules commonly are arranged linearly (referred to as a Koebner phenomenon), especially on the forearms, but may occasionally be grouped near the joints and flexor regions, though they remain discrete and do not merge. The initial lesions remain localized to the chest, abdomen, penis, buttocks, hands, and flexor aspects (joint areas) of the upper extremities. Less commonly though, the disease can progress in a couple of ways: (1) the disease can be strictly isolated to the palms and soles, where yellow papules may become hyperkeratotic (thickened and hardened) and may coalesce into plaques that fissure. This process can have the appearance of “...a non-specific keratoderma resembling chronic eczema.” (2) The disease may also become more widespread, with papules widely distributed on the body—the extensor (top side) surfaces of the elbows, wrists, and hands, folds of the neck, submammary region (under the breasts) in females, groin, thighs, ankles, and feet—and fusing into erythematous, minimally scaled plaques, with redness that develops tints of violet, brown, and yellow.

== Clinical presentation on the groin ==
Photograph of Lichen Nitidus, papules visible on the glans and shaft of penis.

Lichen nitidus commonly presents itself on the groin, typically on the shaft of the penis, though papules may be present on the glans. As with the rest of the body, the disease is benign, not contagious, and does not require treatment, though the presence of lesions on the penis may result in anxiety and mental stress, especially when many lesions are visible. Lichen nitidus present on the penis may be improperly diagnosed, such as pearly penile papules, genital warts, or a sexually transmitted disease. Misdiagnoses can lead to additional stress, including distrust from the patient's partner, and unnecessary and ineffective treatment. There are few reports regarding the prognosis and treatment of lichen nitidus on the penis, though the disease tends to spontaneously resolve itself after several years.

== Pathology ==
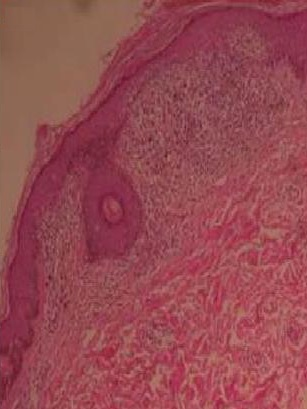
Histopathology of lichen nitidus: Downward extension of the rete ridges at the lateral margins of a lymphohistiocytic infiltrate, resulting in a typical "claw clutching a ball" appearance.

The histology of lichen nitidus is significant for a "...localized granulomatous lymphohistiocytic infiltrate in an expanded dermal papilla with thinning of overlying epidermis and downward extension of the rete ridges at the lateral margin of the infiltrate, producing a typical 'claw clutching a ball' picture...."

== Treatment ==
Generally, lichen nitidus is asymptomatic and self-limited; therefore, no treatment is required. However, if persistent pruritus is present, or the appearance “...interferes with daily activities or outlook...” topical glucocorticoids may be used to attempt treatment. If the disease process is symptomatic, generalized and extensive, oral glucocorticoids may be recommended. Other reported treatments include PUVA, UVA/UVB phototherapy, astemizole, acitretin, and etretinate. When appears with sun/humidity; air conditioning (cool dry air) reduces swelling and discomfort.

== History ==
Felix Pinkus first described the condition in 1907.

== See also ==
- Lichen planus
- List of cutaneous conditions
