= Walter Dowdle =

American microbiologist (1930–2025)

Walter R. Dowdle
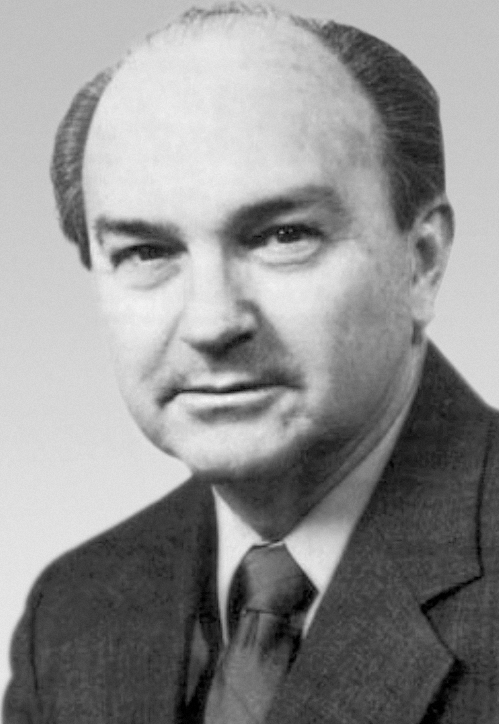
- Born: December 11, 1930; Irvington, Alabama, U.S.
- Died: November 17, 2025 (aged 94); Hahira, Georgia, U.S.
- Citizenship: United States
- Education: University of Alabama (BS, MS); University of Maryland (PhD)
- Known for: Public health; HIV/AIDS; Microbiology
- Scientific career
- Fields: Microbiology
- Workplaces: CDC

Walter Reid Dowdle (December 11, 1930 – November 17, 2025) was an American microbiologist. He was the principal deputy director of the Centers for Disease Control and Prevention (CDC) from 1987 to 1994.

== Early life and education ==
Dowdle was born on December 11, 1930, in Irvington, Alabama, and grew up in Bayou La Batre, Alabama. He was the second of four children born to Rebecca Powell, a schoolteacher, and Ruble Dowdle, a Louisville and Nashville Railroad station agent.

After initially attending Spring Hill College, Dowdle paused his studies for financial reasons to serve four years in the U.S. Air Force medical corps. During this period, he was stationed in Germany during the Berlin Airlift and served in South Korea during the Korean War. Upon his return, he earned a Bachelor of Science and a Master of Science in bacteriology from the University of Alabama in 1957, followed by a doctorate in microbiology from the University of Maryland in 1960. He joined the CDC that same year.

== Career ==
In 1967, Dowdle and his colleagues identified that herpes simplex viruses were not all the same virus. Their research established the distinction between two specific species: HSV-1, typically associated with cold sores, and HSV-2, typically associated with genital infections. By 1976, Dowdle was director of the CDC's virology division, where he oversaw the response to the swine flu outbreak at Fort Dix and led the team that identified the cause of Legionnaires' disease. In 1981, as director of the Center for Infectious Diseases, he was among the first officials to investigate the emergence of what would later be identified as AIDS. He briefly relocated to Washington in 1986 to establish the Office of the Coordinator for AIDS Activities within the Department of Health and Human Services before returning to Atlanta in 1987 as the CDC Deputy Director.

Throughout the late 1980s and early 1990s, Dowdle held several leadership positions at the CDC, including Deputy Director of the CDC and Deputy Administrator of the Agency for Toxic Substances and Disease Registry. He served twice as the Acting Director of the CDC, first in 1989 and again in 1993. During this period, he was recognized by the Watsonian Society as an Honorary PHA (Public Health Advisor and Analyst) for contributions to the practice of public health.

Dowdle retired from the CDC on April 1, 1994. Following his CDC retirement, he joined the Task Force for Global Health, where he worked until 2012 on international initiatives for malaria reduction and polio eradication. He also chaired several HIV vaccine data and safety monitoring boards for global clinical trials in Thailand and the United States.

== Death ==
Dowdle died of a soft tissue sarcoma in Hahira, Georgia, on November 17, 2025, at the age of 94. He was survived by his wife and three children.
