= Margery L. Cook =

American virologist

- Born: 1925; Independence, Missouri, U.S.
- Died: July 6, 2001 (aged 75-76)
- Education: University of California, Los Angeles (Ph.D.)
- Scientific career
- Fields: Herpes virology
- Workplaces: University of California, Los Angeles
- Thesis: Varicella-Zoster virus (1968)
- Doctoral advisor: Jack G. Stevens

Margery Louise Cook (1925 – July 6, 2001) was an American virologist. She was a researcher at University of California, Los Angeles in the field of herpes virology.

== Life ==
Cook was born in Independence, Missouri in 1925. She completed a Ph.D. in medical microbiology and immunology from University of California, Los Angeles (UCLA). For her 1968 dissertation, Cook researched varicella-zoster under mentor Jack G. Stevens.

In 1971, Cook and Stevens published the first direct evidence that herpes simplex can establish persistent latent infection in the spinal ganglia of mice. Her work generated more research in the field of herpes virology. In 1987, she produced a report that the herpes simplex genome can remain harbored in trigeminal ganglia. Cook mentored collaborators, postdoctoral fellows, graduate students, and technicians. She retired from UCLA in 1993.

Cook was a member of the LGBT community. She died on July 6, 2001. She was survived by her partner, Shirley Ashford, her sister Betty Gerkin, and 2 nephews. The Neptune Society conducted a burial at sea on August 4, 2001.
