= Renbök phenomenon =

In the field of dermatology, the Renbök phenomenon is a phenomenon where one skin condition inhibits another. It is also known as the reverse Koebner phenomenon. The term was first used by Happle et al. in 1991. The word "Renbök" is a neologism, made from a reversal of the letters of the name "Köbner".

== See also ==
- Koebner phenomenon
