= 1-Docosanol =

- Skeletal formula of docosanol

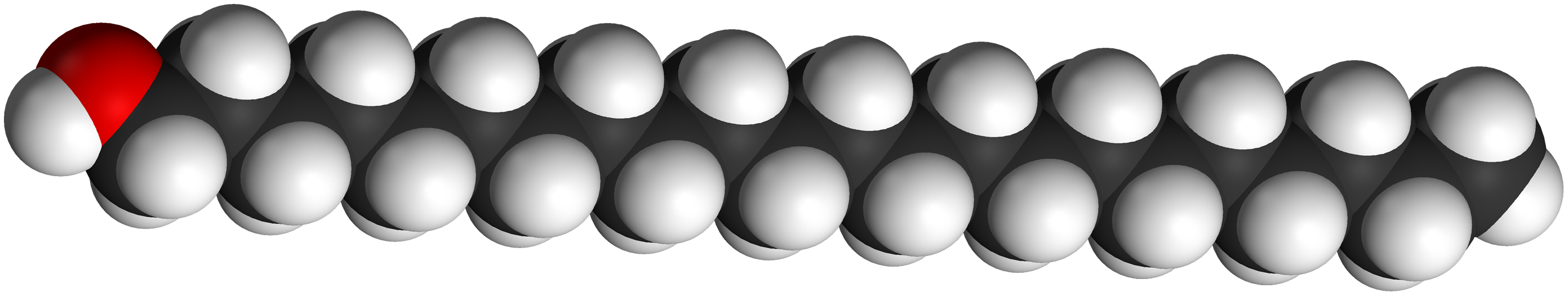
- Spacefill model of docosanol

Names
- Preferred IUPAC name Docosan-1-ol
- Other names: Behenic alcohol; Behenyl alcohol; Cachalot BE-22; 1-Docosanol; n-Docosanol; Docosyl alcohol; Emery 3304; Loxiol VPG 1451

Identifiers
CAS Number	661-19-8
3D model (JSmol)	Interactive image
Beilstein Reference	1770470
ChEBI	CHEBI:31000
ChEMBL	ChEMBL1200453
ChemSpider	12100
DrugBank	DB00632
ECHA InfoCard	100.010.498
EC Number	211-546-6
KEGG	D03884
MeSH	docosanol
PubChem CID	12620
RTECS number	JR1315000
UNII	9G1OE216XY
CompTox Dashboard (EPA)	DTXSID4027286
- InChI: InChI=1S/C22H46O/c1-2-3-4-5-6-7-8-9-10-11-12-13-14-15-16-17-18-19-20-21-22-23/h23H,2-22H2,1H3 Key: NOPFSRXAKWQILS-UHFFFAOYSA-N; InChI=1/C22H46O/c1-2-3-4-5-6-7-8-9-10-11-12-13-14-15-16-17-18-19-20-21-22-23/h23H,2-22H2,1H3 Key: NOPFSRXAKWQILS-UHFFFAOYAB
- SMILES: CCCCCCCCCCCCCCCCCCCCCCO

Properties
Chemical formula	C_{22}H_{46}O
Molar mass	326.609 g·mol^{−1}
Melting point	70 °C; 158 °F; 343 K
Boiling point	180 °C; 356 °F; 453 K at 29 Pa
log P	10.009

Pharmacology
ATC code	D06BB11 (WHO)
Routes of administration	Topical
Legal status	US: OTC; EU: Rx-only
- Except where otherwise noted, data are given for materials in their standard state (at 25 °C [77 °F], 100 kPa). verify (what is ?) Infobox references

1-Docosanol, also known as behenyl alcohol, is a saturated fatty alcohol containing 22 carbon atoms, used traditionally as an emollient, emulsifier, and thickener in cosmetics.

In July 2000, docosanol was approved for medical use in the United States as an antiviral agent for reducing the duration of cold sores. It is an over-the-counter medication (OTC). It is sold under the brand name Abreva among others.

== Side effects ==
One of the most common side effects that has been reported from docosanol is headache. Headaches caused by the medication tend to be mild and can occur in any region of the head. In clinical trials, headache occurred in 10.4% of people treated with docosanol cream and 10.7% of people treated with placebo.

The most serious side effects, although rare, are allergic reactions. Some of the patients experienced the symptoms of allergic reactions, including difficulty breathing, confusion, angioedema (facial swelling), fainting, dizziness, hives or chest pain.

Other side effects may include: acne, burning, dryness, itching, rash, redness, acute diarrhea, soreness, swelling.

== Mechanism of action ==
Docosanol is thought to work by interfering with and stabilizing the host cell's surface phospholipids, preventing the fusion of the herpes virus's viral envelope with the human host cell. This disrupted ability of the virus to fuse with the host cell membrane prevents entry and subsequent replication.

== History ==
The drug was approved as a cream for oral herpes after clinical trials by the FDA in July 2000. It was shown to shorten the healing by 17.5 hours on average (95% confidence interval: 2 to 22 hours) in a placebo-controlled trial. Another trial showed no effect when treating the infected backs of guinea pigs.

Two experiments with 1-docosanol cream failed to show statistically significant differences by any parameter between 1-docosanol cream and vehicle control–treated sites or between 1-docosanol and untreated infection sites.

== Society and culture ==
=== Controversy ===
In March 2007, it was the subject of a US nationwide class-action suit against Avanir and GlaxoSmithKline as the claim that it cut recovery times in half was found to have been misleading in a California court, but the case was eventually settled and the "cuts healing time in half" claim had not been used in product advertising for some years, instead stating "clinically proven to speed healing".
