= Isomorph (gene) =

In Muller's classification, an isomorph is described as a gene mutation that expresses a nonsense point mutant, with expression identical to the original allele.

Therefore, in respect to the relationships between the original and mutated genes, it is difficult to ascertain the effects of dominanceness and/or recessiveness.

Muller's classification of mutant alleles

Category	Alternative function
Wild type	Referent gene expression, normal expression of parent allele
Amorph	Dysfunctional, with null expression
Hypomorph	Reduced or partially reduced gene activity
Hypermorph	Increased or partially increased parent gene activity
Neomorph	Novel function, compared to the new property
Antimorph	Interfering with gene activity
Isomorph	Expression identical to the original (parent) allele, mostly resulting from silent point mutations

== See also ==
- Allele
- Mutation
- Muller's morphs
