= Penciclovir =

Chemical compound

Clinical data
- Pronunciation: /ˌpɛnˈsaɪkloʊˌvɪər/
- Trade names: Denavir
- AHFS/Drugs.com: Monograph
- MedlinePlus: a697027
- License data: US DailyMed: Penciclovir
- Pregnancy category: AU: B1
- Routes of administration: Topical
- ATC code: D06BB06 (WHO) J05AB13 (WHO)

Legal status
- Legal status: AU: S4 (Prescription only); US: ℞-only

Pharmacokinetic data
- Bioavailability: 1.5% (oral), negligible (topical)
- Protein binding: <20%
- Metabolism: Viral thymidine kinase
- Elimination half-life: 2.2–2.3 hours
- Excretion: Kidney

Identifiers
- IUPAC name: 2-amino-9-[4-hydroxy-3-(hydroxymethyl)butyl]-1H-purin-6(9H)-one
- CAS Number: 39809-25-1
- PubChem CID: 135398748
- DrugBank: DB00299
- ChemSpider: 4563
- UNII: 359HUE8FJC
- KEGG: D05407
- ChEBI: CHEBI:7956
- ChEMBL: ChEMBL1540
- CompTox Dashboard (EPA): DTXSID9046491
- ECHA InfoCard: 100.189.687

Chemical and physical data
- Formula: C_{10}H_{15}N_{5}O_{3}
- Molar mass: 253.262 g·mol^{−1}
- 3D model (JSmol): Interactive image
- Melting point: 275 to 277 °C (527 to 531 °F)
- SMILES: O=C2/N=C(\Nc1n(cnc12)CCC(CO)CO)N
- InChI: InChI=1S/C10H15N5O3/c11-10-13-8-7(9(18)14-10)12-5-15(8)2-1-6(3-16)4-17/h5-6,16-17H,1-4H2,(H3,11,13,14,18); Key:JNTOCHDNEULJHD-UHFFFAOYSA-N

Penciclovir is a guanosine analogue antiviral medication used for the treatment of various herpesvirus infections. It is a nucleoside analogue which exhibits low toxicity and good selectivity. It is used as a topical treatment. It is sold under the brand name Denavir among others.

Penciclovir was approved for medical use in 1996.

== Medical use ==
In herpes labialis, the duration of healing, pain and detectable virus is reduced by up to one day, compared with the total duration of 2–3 weeks of disease presentation.

== Mechanism of action ==
Penciclovir is inactive in its initial form. In herpesvirus-infected cells, viral thymidine kinase phosphorylates penciclovir to penciclovir monophosphate; this first phosphorylation step is the rate-limiting step in its activation. Cellular kinases then phosphorylate penciclovir monophosphate to the diphosphate and subsequently to the active triphosphate, producing the active penciclovir triphosphate. Penciclovir triphosphate competitively inhibits viral DNA polymerase by competing with deoxyguanosine triphosphate (dGTP), thereby inhibiting viral DNA synthesis and replication.

The selectivity of penciclovir may be attributed to two factors. First, cellular thymidine kinases phosphorylate penciclovir only to a small extent, whereas viral thymidine kinase phosphorylates it much more efficiently, so the active triphosphate is present at much higher concentrations in virally infected cells than in uninfected cells. Second, penciclovir triphosphate inhibits viral DNA polymerase preferentially over cellular DNA polymerases with a much higher affinity than to human DNA polymerases. As a result of its preferential activation in infected cells and relatively low activity against cellular DNA polymerases, penciclovir has low cytotoxicity toward uninfected cells.

The structure and mode of action of penciclovir are very similar to that of other nucleoside analogues, such as the more widely used aciclovir. A difference between aciclovir and penciclovir is that the active triphosphate form of penciclovir persists within the cell for a much longer time than the activated form of aciclovir, so the concentration within the cell of penciclovir will be higher given equivalent cellular doses.
