= Autoinoculation =

Autoinoculation is derived from the Latin root words "autos" and "inoculate" that mean "self implanting" or "self infection" or "implanting something from oneself". Autoinoculation can refer to both beneficial medical procedures (e.g. vaccination) as well as non-beneficial or harmful natural processes (e.g. infection or disease). One beneficial autoinoculation medical procedure is when cells are removed from a person's body, medically altered then reinserted ("implanted" or "infected") into the same organism or person again to achieve some diagnostic or treatment aim.

- For example, stem cell treatments involve the harvesting of stem cells from one's own bone marrow and reintroduction (autoinoculation) of those cells at a later date, sometimes after altering those stem cells.
- Autoinoculation may also be used for the transplantation of a patient's own healthy bone marrow after recovering from a condition afflicting the tissue.
- Autoinoculation can also refer to the process by which viruses reproduce themselves within an organism by implanting themselves in an organism's cells, altering the metabolism, DNA repair, and replication processes of those cells, using those processes to reproduce and transmit itself throughout the organism. For example, warts and molluscum contagiosum can be spread by this method if infected tissue cells (skin cells altered by a papillomavirus or molluscum contagiosum virus) are mechanically transported to another part of the body. This transmission or autoinoculation can occur by mechanical touching of one part of the organism to another, or friction that removes a portion of the infected cells to an external surface (or another organism) and then reintroduces those cells upon contact with the body elsewhere. However, these viruses are confined to the epithelium and are not transported through the blood stream of an organism to cause new infections.
