= Famciclovir =

Chemical compound

Clinical data
- Pronunciation: /ˌfæmˈsaɪkloʊˌvɪər/
- Trade names: Famvir
- AHFS/Drugs.com: Monograph
- MedlinePlus: a694038
- Pregnancy category: AU: B1
- Routes of administration: By mouth
- ATC code: J05AB09 (WHO) S01AD07 (WHO)

Legal status
- Legal status: AU: S3, S4; UK: POM (Prescription only); US: ℞-only

Pharmacokinetic data
- Bioavailability: 75–77%
- Protein binding: 20–25%
- Metabolism: Liver, circulation, intestinal wall (to penciclovir)
- Elimination half-life: 2–2.3 hours
- Excretion: Kidney, faecal

Identifiers
- IUPAC name: 2-[(acetyloxy)methyl]-4-(2-amino-9H-purin-9-yl)butyl acetate
- CAS Number: 104227-87-4
- PubChem CID: 3324
- DrugBank: DB00426
- ChemSpider: 3207
- UNII: QIC03ANI02
- KEGG: D00317
- ChEBI: CHEBI:4974
- ChEMBL: ChEMBL880
- CompTox Dashboard (EPA): DTXSID0023038
- ECHA InfoCard: 100.158.713

Chemical and physical data
- Formula: C_{14}H_{19}N_{5}O_{4}
- Molar mass: 321.337 g·mol^{−1}
- 3D model (JSmol): Interactive image
- Melting point: 103 °C (217 °F)
- SMILES: O=C(OCC(COC(=O)C)CCn1c2nc(ncc2nc1)N)C
- InChI: InChI=1S/C14H19N5O4/c1-9(20)22-6-11(7-23-10(2)21)3-4-19-8-17-12-5-16-14(15)18-13(12)19/h5,8,11H,3-4,6-7H2,1-2H3,(H2,15,16,18); Key:GGXKWVWZWMLJEH-UHFFFAOYSA-N

Famciclovir is a guanosine analogue antiviral drug used for the treatment of various herpesvirus infections, most commonly for herpes zoster (shingles). It is a prodrug form of penciclovir with improved oral bioavailability. Famciclovir is marketed under the trade name Famvir (Novartis).

Famciclovir was patented in 1983 and approved for medical use in 1994. In 2007, the United States Food and Drug Administration approved the first generic version of famciclovir. Generic tablets are manufactured by TEVA Pharmaceuticals and Mylan Pharmaceuticals.

== Medical uses ==
Famciclovir is indicated for the treatment of herpes zoster (shingles), treatment of herpes simplex virus 2 (genital herpes), herpes labialis (cold sores) in immunocompetent patients and for the suppression of recurring episodes of herpes simplex virus 2. It is also indicated for treatment of recurrent episodes of herpes simplex in HIV patients.

== Adverse effects ==
Side effects: mild to extreme stomach upset, headaches, mild fever.

== Herpes ==
=== Early treatment ===
Several studies in humans and mice provide evidence that early treatment with famciclovir soon after the first infection with herpes can significantly lower the chance of future outbreaks. Use of famciclovir in this manner has been shown to reduce the amount of latent virus in the neural ganglia compared to no treatment or treatment with valaciclovir. A review of human subjects treated for five days with famciclovir 250 mg three times daily during their first herpes episode found that only 4.2 percent experienced a recurrence within six months after the first outbreak, a fivefold decrease compared to the 19 percent recurrence in acyclovir-treated patients. Neither drug affected latency if treatment was delayed for several months.

== History ==
Initially studied as compound BRL 42810, famciclovir grew out of the study of "several potential prodrugs of penciclovir", that were synthesized by M. R. Harnden and R. L. Jarvest from the Beecham Group plc. in the late 1980s. After showing promise on studies with mice, BRL 42810 (famciclovir) was selected for further evaluation and progression to studies in humans.
