= BVU =

BVU may refer to

Air transport

- IATA code for Beluga Airport
- Federal Aviation Authority location identifier for Boulder City Municipal Airport
- ICAO code for Bellview Airlines (Sierra Leone)

Educational establishments

- Buena Vista University
- Bharati Vidyapeeth University

Other

- Bristol Virginia Utilities, USA utility company
- Bromovinyluracil, the metabolite of the drugs brivudine and sorivudine
