= Wafik El-Deiry =

Egyptian-American medical researcher

- Born: 1961 (age 64–65); Egypt
- Citizenship: United States
- Education: University of Miami Miller School of Medicine
- Known for: Discovery of WAF1/p21, p53 binding site
- Scientific career
- Fields: Oncology, Cancer research
- Workplaces: Warren Alpert Medical School; Fox Chase Cancer Center; Penn State Milton S. Hershey Medical Center; University of Pennsylvania

Wafik El-Deiry (born 1961) is an Egyptian-American physician and cancer researcher who is the associate dean for oncologic sciences at the Warren Alpert Medical School, Brown University. He is also the director of the Cancer Center at Brown University, and the director of the Joint Program in Cancer Biology at Brown University and its affiliated hospitals.

== Career ==
El-Deiry was born in Egypt and immigrated to the United States in 1978. He was formerly a professor of Medicine and Chief of Hematology/Oncology at the Penn State Milton S. Hershey Medical Center. He also served as the associate director for Translational Research and Interim Cancer Center Director at Penn State University. He held an endowed chair in hematology-oncology while at Penn State University: the Rose Dunlap Division Chair in Hematology-Oncology.

== Research ==
El-Deiry made the discoveries of the consensus binding site for p53 and the discovery of WAF1 while working with Bert Vogelstein at Johns Hopkins University. p21(WAF1) was the first mammalian cell cycle inhibitor to be discovered, and was found independently by Wade Harper and Steve Elledge as a CDK2-interacting protein p21(CIP1), Yue Xiong and David Beach as a cyclin-CDK-PCNA interacting protein (p21), and as a senescence derived inhibitor by Noda. Multiple CDK inhibitors have become approved as cancer therapeutics, including palbociclib, abemaciclib and ribociclib. In 2017, El-Deiry's group discovered a micro-RNA family that inhibits CDK4/6. In 2021, Dr. El-Deiry discussed the discovery of WAF1 in an interview entitled "Persistence. Agility. Cancer Research with Dr. Wafik El-Deiry" for The Medicine Mentors Podcast.

He was recognized through an award from the American Cancer Society in 2016.

As an independent investigator at University of Pennsylvania, El-Deiry discovered TRAIL death receptor 5 (DR5) in 1997. His group was first to combine gene silencing with bioluminescence imaging in vivo and to use molecular imaging for drug screening. His group created a knockout mouse of death receptor 5 (DR5) that shows reduced apoptosis in vivo after exposure to gamma-radiation, and increased tumor susceptibility in tumor-prone genetic backgrounds. The mechanism by which cell death occurs in vivo after radiation or other DNA damage has remained an important question that has been studied by Michael B. Kastan, Scott W. Lowe, Karen Vousden, and others. El-Deiry's contribution was to define the role of the extrinsic cell death pathway through p53 regulation of death receptor 5.

El-Deiry worked on drug synergies and discovered a potent cancer therapeutic interaction between TRAIL and sorafenib. In 2013, his group reported a TRAIL-inducing compound TIC10 as a novel cancer therapeutic and dual inhibitor of ERK and Akt. TIC10 (also known as ONC201) could cross the blood-brain barrier and treat glioblastoma brain cancer in mice.

== Professional activities ==
In 2001, El-Deiry became the Founding Editor-in-Chief of the peer-reviewed journal Cancer Biology and Therapy.

He is also a member of the American Society for Clinical Investigation (1999), the Association of American Physicians (2008), is a Fellow of the American College of Physicians (2012), and a member of the Johns Hopkins University Society of Scholars (2014).

As a medical oncologist El-Deiry specializes in the care of patients with colorectal cancer. His clinical research demonstrated variability in 5-fluorouracil plasma levels in patients with colorectal cancer. El-Deiry showed that pharmacokinetically guided dosing of 5-fluorouracil chemotherapy is associated with lower levels of toxicity among patients with stage II/III as well as stage IV colorectal cancer. Toxicity from chemotherapy is associated with worse quality of life in patients with cancer. In 2017, his group showed that the tumor suppressor protein p53 represses the DPYD gene in 5-fluorouracil-treated cells and that tumor cells with mutated p53 have higher levels of DPYD thereby becoming resistant to 5-fluorouracil. DPYD is involved in the metabolism of 5-fluorouracil and patients with DPD-deficiency have predictable toxicity from 5-fluorouracil.

El-Deiry was appointed co-Editor-in-Chief of the journal Oncotarget on June 23, 2024.

El-Deiry was the subject of a Retraction Watch article on June 10, 2025.
