= BVDU =

BVDU is the abbreviation for:

- Brivudine (bromovinyldeoxyuridine), an antiviral drug
- Bharati Vidyapeeth Deemed University
