= International Journal of Information Technology =

- Discipline: Information Technology
- Language: English
- Edited by: M. N. Hoda

Publication details
- History: 2017–present
- Publisher: Springer Nature on behalf of Bharati Vidyapeeth's Institute of Computer Applications and Management (BVICAM) (India)
- Frequency: Monthly
- Open access: Hybrid

Standard abbreviations
- ISO 4: Int. J. Inf. Technol.

Indexing
- ISSN: 2511-2104 (print); 2511-2112 (web)
- OCLC no.: 1012495179

Links
- Journal homepage; Online access

The International Journal of Information Technology is an academic, peer-reviewed publication that has been established since 2017 provides an insight into the latest developments in Information Technology (IT) and computing. This journal is published by Springer Nature on behalf of the Bharati Vidyapeeth Institute of Computer Applications and Management (BVICAM) located in New Delhi, India.

== About ==
It publishes original, theoretical, practical research on a wide range of topics related to computer science and IT, including but not limited to algorithm design, distributed systems (cloud computing), artificial intelligence (AI) and neural networks, data mining and analytics, computer networks, security, software engineering, human-computer interaction (HCI), robotics, and big data.

This journal has also been involved in publishing peer-reviewed conference proceedings.

== Indexing and abstracting ==
The journal is abstracted and indexed in:

- Scopus
- INSPEC
- EBSCO databases
