= Kotij =

Village in Maharashtra

- Suburb
- Location within India
- Coordinates: 17°21′20″N 74°26′09″E
- Country: India
- State: Maharashtra
- District: Sangli
- Taluka: Kadegaon

Population (2011)
  - Total: 1,182

Languages
  - Official: Marathi
- Time zone: UTC+5:30 (IST)
- PIN: 415311
- Telephone code: 02347

Kotij is a suburb of Sangli District in the Indian state of Maharashtra.

== Demographics ==
Kotij is a village located in Kadegaon Taluka of Sangli district, Maharashtra. Established in 1426 by a group of Muslims originating from India, the village has a rich cultural and historical background. The founders invited homeless individuals from nearby areas, offering them land for farming, which helped establish a thriving community.

One of the notable landmarks in Kotij is the Hajarat Miyasaheb Mamulabi Dargah, symbolizing the bond between a brother and sister. Historical records in the Helavi register, written in the Modi script, mention this dargah as a key part of the village’s heritage.

Historical Significance

According to local lore, Kotij was originally named Kuntij, inspired by a story from the Mahabharata. It is believed that Kunti, the mother of the Pandavas, visited the area and stayed for a night. During this time, a temple was reportedly constructed overnight, and the village was named Kuntij in her honor. Over time, the name evolved into Kotij.

Population Statistics

As per the 2011 Census, Kotij has a population of 1,182, comprising 572 males and 610 females across 273 families.

Children (0-6 years): 111 (9.39% of the total population)

Average Sex Ratio: 1,066 (higher than Maharashtra's state average of 929)

Child Sex Ratio: 790 (lower than Maharashtra's average of 894)

Geographical Context

Kotij belongs to the Desh or Paschim Maharashtra region and falls under the Pune Division. It is situated:

67 km north of Sangli (district headquarters)

15 km from Kadegaon (Taluka headquarters)

291 km from Mumbai (state capital)

Connectivity and Nearby Locations

Kotij is well-connected to nearby villages and cities:

Nearby Villages: Kherade Wangi (2 km), Yetgaon (2 km), Kanharwadi (6 km), Hanamantvadiye (6 km), and Tondoli (7 km)

Nearby Cities: Mahuli, Vita, Karad, and Uran Islampur

Kotij is bordered by Karad Taluka to the west, Palus Taluka to the south, Khanapur-Vita Taluka to the east, and Khatav Taluka to the north.

== Education ==
A government school is there in the bus stand where 5th standard is the highest class. Later students have to go to Bharati Vidyapeeth High School and College within 1 km.

Bharati Vidyapeeth which was established in 1993 gave the students of Kotij higher education. It was started by Patangrao Kadam.
