= Tegafur/uracil =

Chemotherapy drug used in the treatment of cancer

Combination of
- Tegafur: Antineoplastic agent
- Uracil: Nucleobase

Clinical data
- Trade names: Uftoral, others

Identifiers
- CAS Number: 74578-38-4
- PubChem CID: 104747
- DrugBank: DB09327
- UNII: HMI5GR78FR

Tegafur/uracil (abbreviation: UFT) is a chemotherapy drug combination used in the treatment of cancer, primarily bowel cancer.

UFT is an oral formulation combining uracil (a competitive inhibitor of dihydropyrimidine dehydrogenase), and tegafur (a bioavailable 5-fluorouracil (5-FU) prodrug) in a 4:1 molar ratio.

Uracil has also been stated to help protect the gastrointestinal tract from 5-FU toxicity and the related metabolites, with less side effects than 5-FU and other 5-FU related (pro)drugs.

== Pharmacology ==
=== Pharmacodynamics ===
Tetrahydrofuran metabolites of tegafur have been shown to exhibit antiangiogenic effects and improve cytocidal performance of 5-FU, particularly in patients with over-expressed HIF-1.

=== Pharmacokinetics ===
5-FU exhibits poor intestinal penetration and significant intestinal and hepatic first-pass metabolism by DPD, resulting in low and erratic systemic bioavailibility as well as formation of toxic metabolites. Tegafur, after being absorbed from the gastrointestinal tract and delivered to the liver by the portal venous system, is converted to the bioactive compound 5-FU by hepatic cytochrome P450 enzymes. Meanwhile, the surplus of uracil competitively inhibits hepatic DPD, preventing immediate inactivation of the just formed 5-FU.

== Clinical trials ==
Trials using UFT for cancer treatment include pancreatic cancer, colorectal cancer, liver cancer, adenocarcinoma of the lung, and breast cancer, with significant gains over existing treatments, including reduced side effects, improved quality of life, improved disease free survival and/or overall survival.

== History ==
The UFT combination was developed in Japan during the 1980s. UFT is approved in over 50 countries as a cancer therapy, most commonly for advanced colorectal cancer to replace 5FU, and has a low cost. "[P]atients appeared strongly to prefer treatment with [oral] UFT/LV over [intravenous] 5-FU/LV." In Japan, UFT is approved for cancer treatments including tumors of the colon/rectum, lung, breast, stomach, head and neck, liver, gallbladder, bile duct, pancreas, bladder, prostate, and cervix. In the UK, tegafur/uracil with folinic acid is approved as first line treatment by the National Institute for Health and Clinical Excellence (NICE) for metastatic colorectal cancer.

== Available forms ==
Tegafur/uracil is marketed by companies including Merck Serono, Korea United and Jeil, Taiho, mostly in Asia, Europe, South America, Central America and South Africa.

It is made by various manufacturers and sold under a variety of names including: Tegafur-uracil, UFT, Ftorafur, Tefudex, Ufur and Uftoral. The UFT brand version is authorized for marketing in over 50 countries. Between 1984 and 2006, over 30 million patients were treated with UFT.
