= UFT =

UFT may stand for:

- Upper fibers of trapezius
- Unified field theory, a theory in physics
- United Faculty of Theology in Melbourne, Victoria
- United Federation of Teachers, a New York union
- Universidade Federal do Tocantins, a Brazilian university
- Finis Terrae University (Universidad Finis Terrae), a Chilean university
- Tegafur/uracil, a chemotherapy drug used in the treatment of cancer
- Ultimate Family Tree, a discontinued genealogy program from Ancestry.com
- Micro Focus Unified Functional Testing, a testing and quality assurance software solution
- University of Toronto, from a misspelling of its popular abbreviation “U of T”
