= Sorivudine =

Chemical compound

Clinical data
- Trade names: Usevir, Brovavir
- Other names: BV-araU, Bromovinyl araU, 5-Bromovinyl-araU, 5-[(E)-2-bromoethenyl]-1-[(2R,3S,4S,5R)-3,4-dihydroxy-5-(hydroxymethyl)oxolan-2-yl]pyrimidine-2,4-dione
- Routes of administration: Oral
- ATC code: none

Pharmacokinetic data
- Metabolism: Viral thymidine kinase
- Excretion: Kidney

Identifiers
- IUPAC name: 1-β-D-arabinofuranosyl-5-[(E)-2-bromovinyl]pyrimidine-2,4(1H,3H)-dione
- CAS Number: 77181-69-2
- PubChem CID: 5282192
- ChemSpider: 4445384
- UNII: C7VOZ162LV
- KEGG: D01734
- ChEMBL: ChEMBL375035
- CompTox Dashboard (EPA): DTXSID6057827

Chemical and physical data
- Formula: C_{11}H_{13}BrN_{2}O_{6}
- Molar mass: 349.137 g·mol^{−1}
- 3D model (JSmol): Interactive image
- SMILES: c1c(c(=O)[nH]c(=O)n1[C@H]2[C@H]([C@@H]([C@H](O2)CO)O)O)/C=C/Br
- InChI: InChI=1S/C11H13BrN2O6/c12-2-1-5-3-14(11(19)13-9(5)18)10-8(17)7(16)6(4-15)20-10/h1-3,6-8,10,15-17H,4H2,(H,13,18,19)/b2-1+/t6-,7-,8+,10-/m1/s1; Key:GCQYYIHYQMVWLT-HQNLTJAPSA-N

Sorivudine (INN), is a nucleoside analogue antiviral drug, marketed under trade names such as Usevir (Nippon Shoji, Eisai) and Brovavir (BMS). It is used for the treatment of varicella zoster virus infections.

== Pharmacology ==
=== Feature ===
- Treatment of herpes drug acyclovir was (Zovirax, Activir) from VZV strong activity of the virus.
- Undergoes gastrointestinal absorption, absorption from the gastrointestinal tract after the most degrading without being excreted in urine.

=== Mechanism of action ===
- Sorivudine is phosphorylated by thymidine kinase activity in the body and is absorbed into the virus's DNA instead of the correct nucleoside. It is a competitive inhibitor of DNA polymerase, so the viral DNA cannot be replicated and the virus cannot replicate.

=== Microbiology ===
Sorivudine is active against most species in the herpesvirus family.

- Herpes simplex virus type I (HSV-1)
- Varicella zoster virus (VZV)
- Epstein–Barr virus (EBV)

== Interactions ==
Bromovinyluracil (BVU)

Sorivudine interacts strongly and in some cases lethally with fluorouracil (5-FU), its prodrugs and related substances. This is based on the metabolite bromovinyluracil (BVU), which irreversibly inhibits the enzyme dihydropyrimidine dehydrogenase (DPD) which is necessary for inactivating 5-FU. The closely related drug brivudine has the same interaction.

Also, it should be taken into consideration that the ability to metabolize this drug can decrease with age due to the composition of the gut microbiota. Specifically, after the age of 60, it has been observed a reduction of the metabolic potential to degrade this compound decreases.
