= O6-Benzylguanine =

O^{6}-Benzylguanine

Names
- IUPAC name 6-(Benzyloxy)-7H-purin-2-amine
- Other names 6-(Benzyloxy)guanine; 6-O-Benzylguanine; O(6)-bGua; O6-BG

Identifiers
CAS Number	19916-73-5
3D model (JSmol)	Interactive image
ChemSpider	4417
ECHA InfoCard	100.161.788
PubChem CID	4578
UNII	01KC87F8FE
CompTox Dashboard (EPA)	DTXSID20173700
- InChI: InChI=1S/C12H11N5O/c13-12-16-10-9(14-7-15-10)11(17-12)18-6-8-4-2-1-3-5-8/h1-5,7H,6H2,(H3,13,14,15,16,17) Key: KRWMERLEINMZFT-UHFFFAOYSA-N; InChI=1/C12H11N5O/c13-12-16-10-9(14-7-15-10)11(17-12)18-6-8-4-2-1-3-5-8/h1-5,7H,6H2,(H3,13,14,15,16,17) Key: KRWMERLEINMZFT-UHFFFAOYAI
- SMILES: Nc3nc(OCc1ccccc1)c2nc[nH]c2n3

Properties
Chemical formula	C_{12}H_{11}N_{5}O
Molar mass	241.254 g·mol^{−1}
Density	1.432 g/mL
- Except where otherwise noted, data are given for materials in their standard state (at 25 °C [77 °F], 100 kPa). Infobox references

O^{6}-Benzylguanine (O6-BG) is a synthetic derivative of guanine. It is an antineoplastic agent. It exerts its effect by acting as a suicide inhibitor of the enzyme O6-alkylguanine-DNA alkyltransferase which leads to interruption of DNA repair. O6-BG was used clinically in combination with the alkylating agent temozolomide for glioblastoma, however the combination was found to be overly toxic without adding significant benefit.

O6-BG is also used as a biochemical tool in the study of DNA repair mechanisms.
