= Conjunctival squamous cell carcinoma =

Conjunctival squamous cell carcinoma, NOS
- Specialty: Oncology

Conjunctival squamous cell carcinoma (conjunctival SCC) and corneal intraepithelial neoplasia comprise ocular surface squamous neoplasia (OSSN). SCC is the most common malignancy of the conjunctiva in the US, with a yearly incidence of 1–2.8 per 100,000. Risk factors for the disease are exposure to sun (specifically occupational), exposure to UVB, and light-colored skin. Other risk factors include radiation, smoking, HPV, arsenic, and exposure to polycyclic hydrocarbons.

Conjunctival SCC is often asymptomatic at first, but it can present with the presence of a growth, red eye, pain, itching, burning, tearing, sensitivity to light, double vision, and decreased vision. Spread of conjunctival SCC can occur in 1–21% of cases, with the first site of spread being the regional lymph nodes. Mortality for conjunctival SCC ranges from 0–8%. Diagnosis is often made by biopsy, as well as CT (in the case of invasive SCC).

Treatment of conjunctival SCC is usually surgical excision followed by cryotherapy. After this procedure, Conjunctival SCC can recur 8–40% of the time. Radiation treatment, topical Mitomycin C, and removal of the contents of the orbit, or exenteration, are other methods of treatment. Close follow-up is recommended, because the average time to recurrence is 8–22 months.

== Classification ==
Cancer can be considered a very large and exceptionally heterogeneous family of malignant diseases, with squamous cell carcinomas comprising one of the largest subsets.

=== Terminology ===
All squamous cell carcinoma lesions are thought to begin via the repeated, uncontrolled division of cancer stem cells of epithelial lineage or characteristics. Accumulation of these cancer cells causes a microscopic focus of abnormal cells that are, at least initially, locally confined within the specific tissue in which the progenitor cell resided. This condition is called squamous cell carcinoma in situ, and it is diagnosed when the tumor has not yet penetrated the basement membrane or other delimiting structure to invade adjacent tissues. Once the lesion has grown and progressed to the point where it has breached, penetrated, and infiltrated adjacent structures, it is referred to as "invasive" squamous cell carcinoma. Once a carcinoma becomes invasive, it is able to spread to other organs and cause a metastasis, or "secondary tumor", to form.

== Causes ==
Human papilloma virus

== Diagnosis ==
The differential for OSSN includes pterygium, pingueculum, papilloma, solar keratosis, lipoma, lymphoma, chronic blepharoconjunctivitis, inflammation, melanoma, ocular pannus, pyogenic granuloma, kaposi sarcoma, keratocanthoma, mucoepidermoid carcinoma, pseudoepitheliomatous hyperplasia, and adenocarcinoma. While confocal microscopy can be used for diagnosis, biopsy is considered the standard, especially before treatment with a cytotoxic medication.

== Management ==
Most conjunctival squamous cell carcinomas are removed with surgery. A few selected cases are treated with topical medication. Surgical excision with a free margin of healthy tissue is a frequent treatment modality. Radiotherapy, given as external beam radiotherapy or as brachytherapy (internal radiotherapy), can also be used to treat squamous cell carcinomas.

== In animals ==
Squamous cell carcinoma of eye tissues is one of the most frequent neoplasms of cattle.

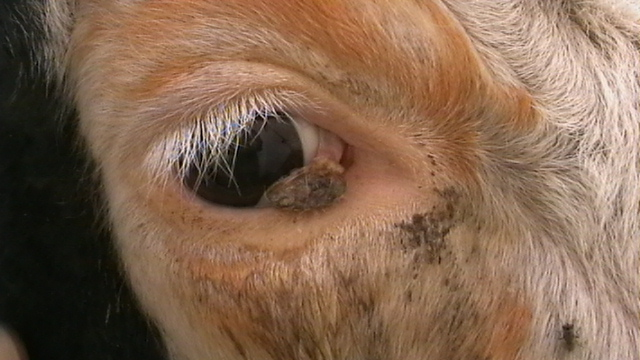
On third eyelid, papilloma-like (see hairs)

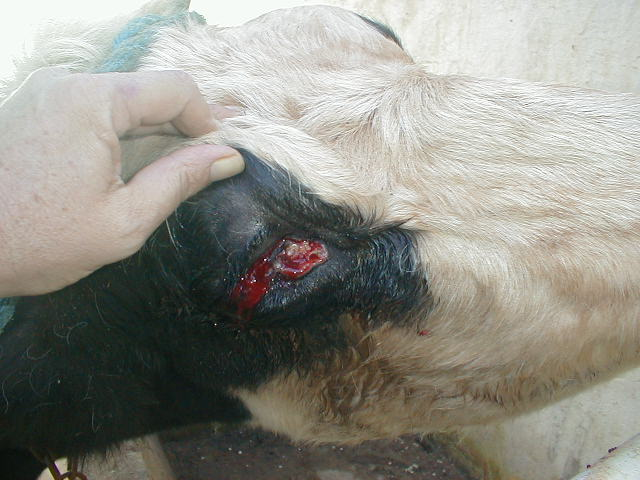
invading conjunctival tissues
