= Thymineless death =

Natural cell death phenomenon

Thymineless death is the phenomenon by which bacteria, yeasts and mammalian cells undergo cell death when they are starved of thymidine triphosphate (dTTP), an essential precursor for DNA replication. This phenomenon underlies the mechanism of action of several antibacterial, antimalarial and anticancer agents, such as trimethoprim, sulfamethoxazole, methotrexate and fluorouracil.

== History ==
The phenomenon was first reported in 1954 by Hazel D. Barner and Seymour S. Cohen in Escherichia coli when thymine-requiring mutants of the bacteria lost viability when grown in a medium lacking thymine but containing other essential nutrients. Subsequently, this discovery led to the development of theories to explain the mechanism of action of several pyrimidine analogs that targeted thymine metabolism in bacteria and tumor cells. The phenomenon was commonly attributed to "unbalanced growth" wherein cells continued fundamental processes of RNA transcription, protein synthesis and metabolism in the absence of DNA replication. However, nutrient starvation does not generally kill cells to the extent observed in cells that lack thymine. The molecular mechanism of thymineless death remains unknown; DNA breaks were observed during thymineless death, which could explain the killing. Possible pathways involved with the killing mechanism include: replication initiation, breakage of ongoing replication forks, futile DNA repair, replication origin destruction, and an addiction module.
