= Dihydropyrimidine dehydrogenase deficiency =

- Other names: DPD deficiency
- Dihydropyrimidine dehydrogenase deficiency has an autosomal recessive pattern of inheritance.
- Specialty: Medical genetics, endocrinology

Dihydropyrimidine dehydrogenase deficiency is an autosomal recessive metabolic disorder in which there is absent or significantly decreased activity of dihydropyrimidine dehydrogenase, an enzyme involved in the metabolism of uracil and thymine.

Individuals with this condition may develop life-threatening toxicity following exposure to 5-fluorouracil (5-FU), a chemotherapy drug that is used in the treatment of cancer. Beside 5-FU, widely prescribed oral fluoropyrimidine capecitabine (Xeloda) could put DPD-deficient patients at risk of experiencing severe or lethal toxicities as well.

== Genetics ==
DPD deficiency is inherited in an autosomal recessive manner. This means the defective gene responsible for the disorder is located on an autosome, and two copies of the defective gene (one inherited from each parent) are required in order to be born with the disorder. The parents of an individual with an autosomal recessive disorder both carry one copy of the defective gene, but usually do not experience any signs or symptoms of the disorder.

== Diagnosis ==
=== Detection ===
A small number of genetic variants have been repeatedly associated with DPD deficiency, such as IVS14+1G>A mutation in intron 14 coupled with exon 14 deletion (a.k.a. DPYD*2A), 496A>G in exon 6; 2846A>T in exon 22 and T1679G (a.k.a. DPYD*13) in exon 13. Testing patients for these allelic variants usually show high specificity (i.e., bearing the mutation means that severe toxicity will occur indeed) but very low sensitivity (i.e., not bearing the mutation does not mean that there is no risk for severe toxicities). Alternatively, phenotyping DPD using ex-vivo enzymatic assay or surrogate testing (i.e., monitoring physiological dihydrouracil to uracil ratio in plasma) has been presented as a possible upfront strategy to detect DPD deficiency. 5-FU test dose (i.e., preliminary administration of a small dose of 5-FU with pharmacokinetics evaluation) has been proposed as another possible alternative strategy to secure the use of fluoropyrimidine drugs.. The Clinical Pharmacogenetics Implementation Consortium (CPIC) has issued guidelines supporting 50% dose reduction in heterozygous carriers of the decreased function variants rs3918290 (c.1905+1G>A), rs55886062 (c.1679T>G), rs56038477(c.1236G>A), rs67376798 (c.2846A>T), c.2846A>T (rs67376798) or c.1129–5923C>G (rs75017182; HapB3 or its tagging SNP c.1236G>A; rs56038477)

Although DPYD pre-treatment screening has been proven to improve drug safety for DPYD*2A carriers by the Food and Drug Administration, the current (version 2016) European Society for Medical Oncology (ESMO) guidelines do not “routinely recommend” upfront genotyping of DPYD*2A before the administration of 5‐FU in metastatic CRC (mCRC) patients. While oncology societies in the United States do not recommend systematic testing. Instead, on April 30, 2020, the European Society for Medical Oncology issued a document recommending genetic testing. The same year, the European Medical Agency released guidelines recommending DPD testing as well. France is the first and only country to require pre-dose DPD testing before administering 5-FU or capecitabine in 2018, based upon plasma uracil measurement as a surrogate for DPD activity. Further real-world studies have suggested that this pre-emptive testing led to a sharp decrease in both severe toxicities and toxic-death, without compromising efficacy.
