= Thymine =

Chemical compound of DNA

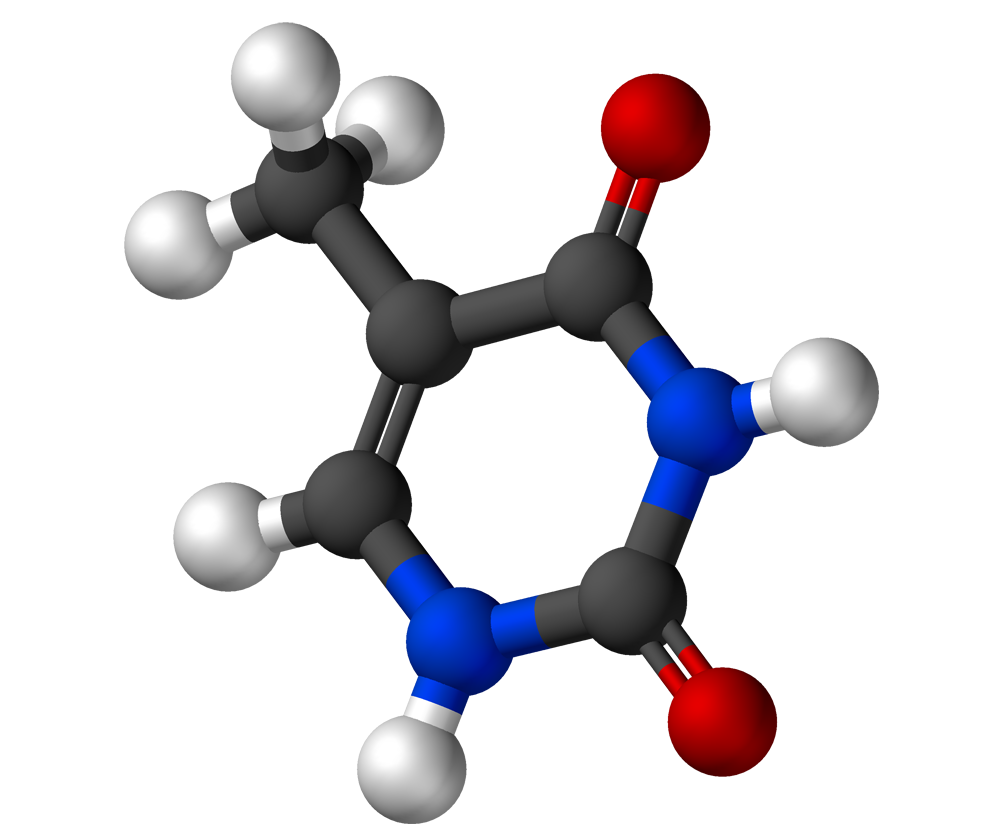

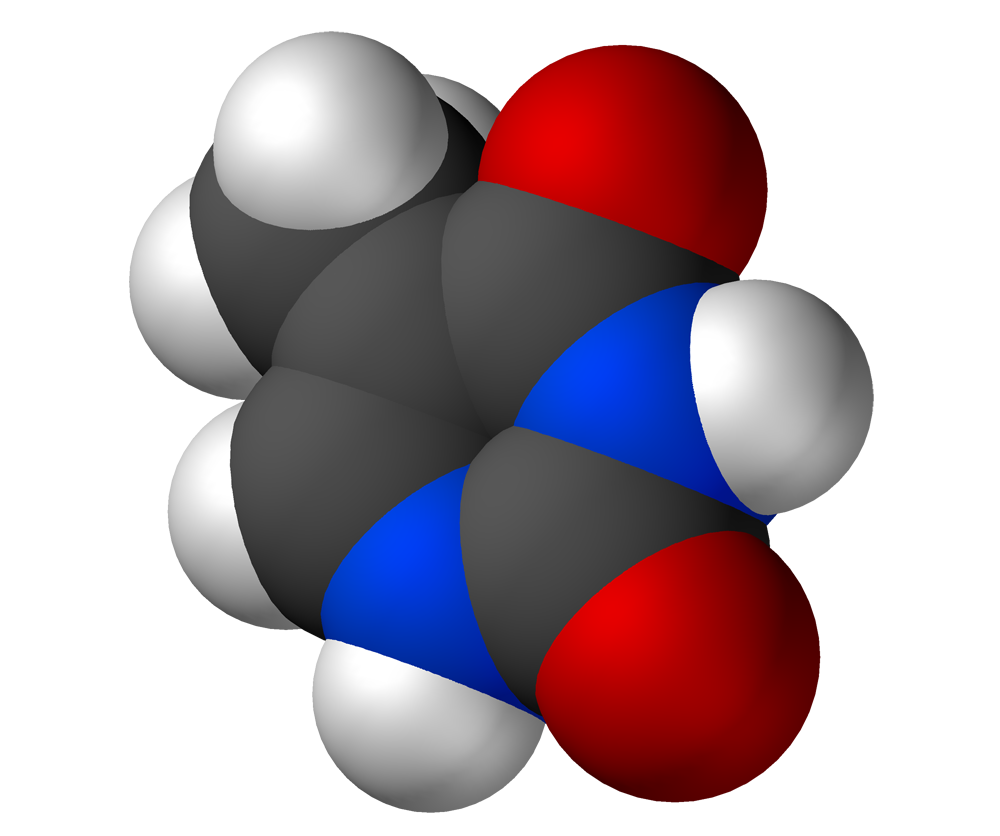

Names
- Preferred IUPAC name 5-Methylpyrimidine-2,4(1H,3H)-dione
- Other names 5-Methyluracil

Identifiers
CAS Number	65-71-4
3D model (JSmol)	Interactive image
ChEBI	CHEBI:17821
ChEMBL	ChEMBL993
ChemSpider	1103
ECHA InfoCard	100.000.560
IUPHAR/BPS	4581
MeSH	Thymine
PubChem CID	1135
UNII	QR26YLT7LT
CompTox Dashboard (EPA)	DTXSID4052342
- InChI: InChI=1S/C5H6N2O2/c1-3-2-6-5(9)7-4(3)8/h2H,1H3,(H2,6,7,8,9) Key: RWQNBRDOKXIBIV-UHFFFAOYSA-N
- SMILES: O=C1NC(=O)NC=C1C

Properties
Chemical formula	C_{5}H_{6}N_{2}O_{2}
Molar mass	126.115 g·mol^{−1}
Density	1.223 g cm^{−3} (calculated)
Melting point	316 to 317 °C (601 to 603 °F; 589 to 590 K)
Boiling point	335 °C (635 °F; 608 K) (decomposes)
Solubility in water	3.82 g/L
Acidity (pK_{a})	9.7
- Except where otherwise noted, data are given for materials in their standard state (at 25 °C [77 °F], 100 kPa). Infobox references

Thymine (/ˈθaɪmiːn/) (symbol T or Thy) is one of the four nucleotide bases in the nucleic acid of DNA that are represented by the letters G–C–A–T. The others are adenine, guanine, and cytosine. Thymine is also known as 5-methyluracil, a pyrimidine nucleobase. In RNA, thymine is replaced by the nucleobase uracil. Thymine was first isolated in 1893 by Albrecht Kossel and Albert Neumann from calf thymus glands, hence its name.

== Derivation ==
As its alternate name (5-methyluracil) suggests, thymine may be derived by methylation of uracil at the 5th carbon. In RNA, thymine is replaced with uracil in most cases. In DNA, thymine (T) binds to adenine (A) via two hydrogen bonds, thereby stabilizing the nucleic acid structures.

Thymine combined with deoxyribose creates the nucleoside deoxythymidine, which is synonymous with the term thymidine. Thymidine can be phosphorylated with up to three phosphoric acid groups, producing dTMP (deoxythymidine monophosphate), dTDP, or dTTP (for the di- and tri- phosphates, respectively).

One of the common mutations of DNA involves two adjacent thymines or cytosine, which, in presence of ultraviolet light, may form thymine dimers, causing "kinks" in the DNA molecule that inhibit normal function.

Thymine could also be a target for actions of 5-fluorouracil (5-FU) in cancer treatment. 5-FU can be a metabolic analog of thymine (in DNA synthesis) or uracil (in RNA synthesis). Substitution of this analog inhibits DNA synthesis in actively dividing cells.

Thymine bases are frequently oxidized to hydantoins over time after the death of an organism.

== Thymine imbalance causes mutation ==
During growth of bacteriophage T4, an imbalance of thymine availability, either a deficiency or an excess of thymine, causes increased mutation. The mutations caused by thymine deficiency appear to occur only at AT base pair sites in DNA and are often AT to GC transition mutations. In the bacterium Escherichia coli, thymine deficiency was also found to cause the same mutation.

== Theoretical aspects ==
In March 2015, NASA scientists reported that, for the first time, complex DNA and RNA organic compounds of life, including uracil, cytosine and thymine, have been formed in the laboratory under outer space conditions, using starting chemicals, such as pyrimidine, found in meteorites. Pyrimidine, like polycyclic aromatic hydrocarbons (PAHs), another carbon-rich compound, may have been formed in red giants or in interstellar dust and gas clouds, according to the scientists. Thymine has not been found in meteorites, which suggests the first strands of DNA had to look elsewhere to obtain this building block. Thymine likely formed within some meteorite parent bodies, but may not have persisted within these bodies due to an oxidation reaction with hydrogen peroxide.

== Synthesis ==
=== Laboratory synthesis ===
Thymine was first prepared by hydrolysis of the corresponding nucleoside obtained from natural sources. Interest in its direct chemical synthesis began in the early 1900s: Emil Fischer published a method starting from urea but a more practical synthesis used methylisothiourea in a condensation reaction with ethyl formyl propionate, followed by hydrolysis of the pyrimidine intermediate:

Many other preparative methods have been developed, including optimised conditions so that urea can be used directly in the reaction shown above, preferably with methyl formyl propionate.

== See also ==
- Deoxyribose
- Deoxythymidine
- Nucleobase
- Pyrimidine
- Thymineless death
- Uracil
