= Bharati Vidyapeeth =

Private university in Pune, India

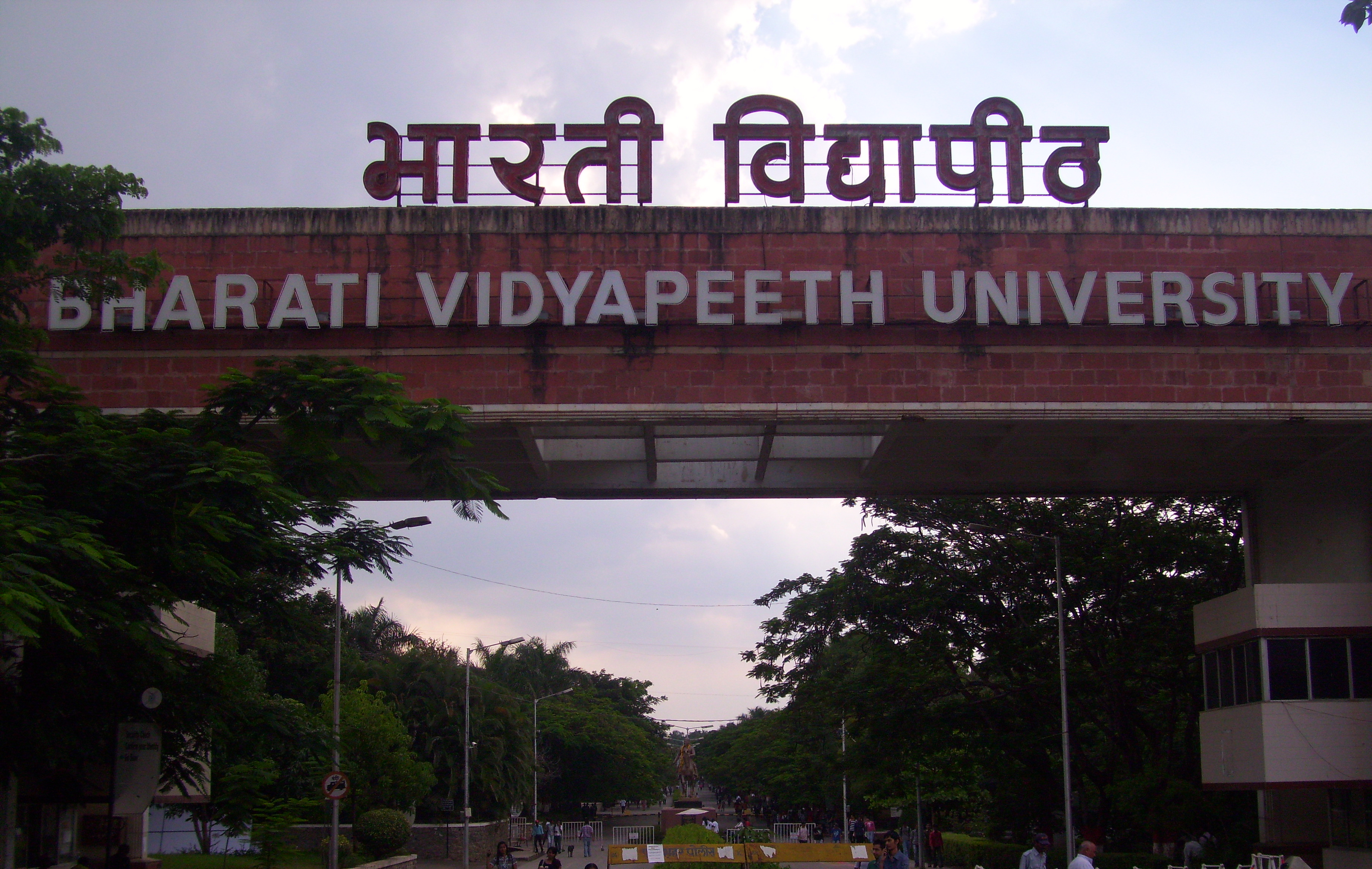
- Type: Private
- Established: 1964; 62 years ago
- Founder: Dr. Patangrao Kadam (Founder-Chancellor)
- Parent institution: Bharati Vidyapeeth (BV)
- Chancellor: Dr. Shivajirao Kadam
- Vice-Chancellor: Dr. Vivek Saoji
- Academic staff: 1600+
- Students: 23000+
- Location: Pune, Maharashtra, India; 18.458076°N 73.855634°E
- Website: www.bvuniversity.edu.in

Bharati Vidyapeeth is a private deemed to be university established in Pune, India. Bharati Vidyapeeth has campuses across the country at New Delhi, Navi Mumbai, Sangli, Pune, Solapur, Kolhapur, Karad, Satara, and Panchgani. Among these are Bharati Vidyapeeth University Medical College, Dentistry, Ayurveda, Homeopathy, Nursing, Pharmacy, Engineering, Management, Hotel Management, Catering Technology, and Environmental Science and Agriculture.

== Rankings ==
University and college rankings

General – India
- NIRF (Universities) (2024): 78

Engineering – India
- NIRF (2024): 151-200

Law – India
- Outlook India (2024): 4

Business/Management – India
- NIRF (2024): 101-125

Pharmacy – India
- NIRF (2024): 80

The National Institutional Ranking Framework (NIRF) ranked Bharati Vidyapeeth 78th among universities for 2024. The university's constituent engineering college, Bharati Vidyapeeth Deemed University College of Engineering, Pune was ranked in the 151-200 band in 2024. Bharati Vidyapeeth's College of Pharmacy was ranked 80 in India by the National Institutional Ranking Framework (NIRF) pharmacy ranking in 2024.

== Notable alumni ==
- Murlidhar Mohol
- Shaheer Sheikh
- Pravin Tarde
- Saurabh Bhardwaj
- Ashish Tulsian
