= Dihydropyrimidine dehydrogenase (NADP+) =

Enzyme found in humans

DPYD

Identifiers
- Aliases: DPYD, DHP, DHPDHASE, DPD, dihydropyrimidine dehydrogenase, DYPD
- External IDs: OMIM: 612779; MGI: 2139667; GeneCards: DPYD
Enzyme activity
EC #	BRENDA	ExPASy	KEGG	MetaCyc
1.3.1.2	↗	↗	↗	↗

Gene location (Human)
Chr.	Chromosome 1 (human)
Band	1p21.3	Start	97,077,743 bp
Band	1p21.3	End	97,995,000 bp

Gene location (Mouse)
Chr.	Chromosome 3 (mouse)
Band	3|3 G1	Start	118,355,778 bp
Band	3|3 G1	End	119,226,573 bp
RNA expression pattern
Bgee	Human / Mouse (ortholog); Top expressed in: germinal epithelium; monocyte; parietal pleura; visceral pleura; palpebral conjunctiva; jejunal mucosa; lower lobe of lung; Achilles tendon; superficial temporal artery; skin of hip / Top expressed in: left lobe of liver; jejunum; ileum; parotid gland; intestinal villus; epithelium of small intestine; human kidney; vestibular membrane of cochlear duct; duodenum; Paneth cell; More reference expression data
BioGPS	More reference expression data
Gene ontology
Molecular function	oxidoreductase activity, acting on the CH-CH group of donors; 4 iron, 4 sulfur cluster binding; nucleotide binding; protein homodimerization activity; flavin adenine dinucleotide binding; dihydropyrimidine dehydrogenase (NADP+) activity; iron-sulfur cluster binding; metal ion binding; protein binding; catalytic activity; NADP binding; oxidoreductase activity; uracil binding; NADH dehydrogenase activity; dihydropyrimidine dehydrogenase (NAD+) activity
Cellular component	cytoplasm; cytosol
Biological process	beta-alanine biosynthetic process; uracil catabolic process; pyrimidine nucleoside catabolic process; pyrimidine nucleobase catabolic process; thymidine catabolic process; purine nucleobase catabolic process; thymine catabolic process
Sources:Amigo / QuickGO
Orthologs
Databases	NCBI: entry; OMA: entry
Species	Human	Mouse
Entrez	1806	99586
Ensembl	ENSG00000188641	ENSMUSG00000033308
UniProt	Q12882	Q8CHR6
RefSeq (mRNA)	NM_000110; NM_001160301	NM_170778
RefSeq (protein)	NP_000101; NP_001153773	NP_740748
Location (UCSC)	Chr 1: 97.08 – 98 Mb	Chr 3: 118.36 – 119.23 Mb
PubMed search
- Wikidata
View/Edit Human	View/Edit Mouse

dihydropyrimidine dehydrogenase (NADP+)
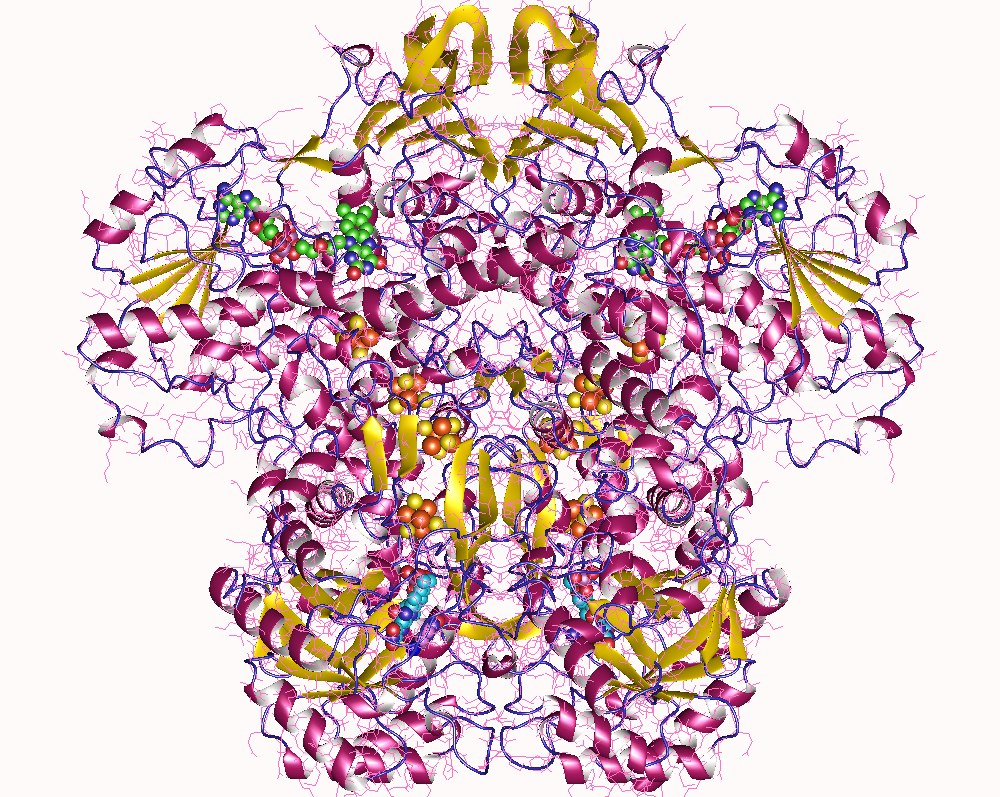
- Dihydroprymidine dehydrogenase dimer, Sus scrofa

Identifiers
- EC no.: 1.3.1.2
- CAS no.: 9029-01-0
- Alt. names: Dihydrothymine dehydrogenase

Databases
- BRENDA: enzyme data
- ExPASy: NiceZyme view
- KEGG: enzyme entry
- MetaCyc: metabolic pathway
- Rhea: reactions
- PDB structures: RCSB PDB PDBe PDBsum
- Gene Ontology: AmiGO / QuickGO
Search
- PMC: articles
- PubMed: articles
- NCBI: proteins

Dihydropyrimidine dehydrogenase (NADP+) (EC 1.3.1.2) is an enzyme that in humans is encoded by the DPYD gene. It catalyzes the chemical reaction

uracil
+ NADPH
H^{+}
H^{+}
dihydrouracil
+ NADP^{+}

In the catabolism of uracil, the enzyme converts uracil to dihydrouracil using nicotinamide adenine dinucleotide phosphate (NADPH) as its cofactor. It can also act on thymine to give dihydrothymine.

In humans the enzyme is encoded by the DPYD gene. It is the initial and rate-limiting step in pyrimidine catabolism. It is also involved in the degradation of the chemotherapeutic drugs 5-fluorouracil and tegafur. It participates in beta-alanine metabolism and pantothenate and coa biosynthesis.

== Terminology ==
The systematic name of this enzyme class is 5,6-dihydrouracil:NADP+ 5-oxidoreductase.
Other names in common use include:

- dihydrothymine dehydrogenase
- dihydrouracil dehydrogenase (NADP+)
- 4,5-dihydrothymine: oxidoreductase
- DPD
- DHPDH
- dehydrogenase, dihydrouracil (nicotinamide adenine dinucleotide, phosphate)
- DHU dehydrogenase
- hydropyrimidine dehydrogenase
- dihydropyrimidine dehydrogenase (NADP+)

== Structural studies ==
As of late 2007, 5 structures have been solved for this class of enzymes, with PDB accession codes PDB: 1GT8, PDB: 1GTE, PDB: 1GTH, PDB: 1H7W, and PDB: 1H7X.

== Function ==
The protein is a pyrimidine catabolic enzyme and the initial and rate-limiting factor in the pathway of uracil and thymidine catabolism. Genetic deficiency of this enzyme results in an error in pyrimidine metabolism associated with thymine-uraciluria and an increased risk of toxicity in cancer patients receiving 5-fluorouracil chemotherapy.

== Interactive pathway map ==
Click on genes, proteins and metabolites below to link to respective articles. (Note: The interactive pathway map can be edited at WikiPathways: "FluoropyrimidineActivity_WP1601".)

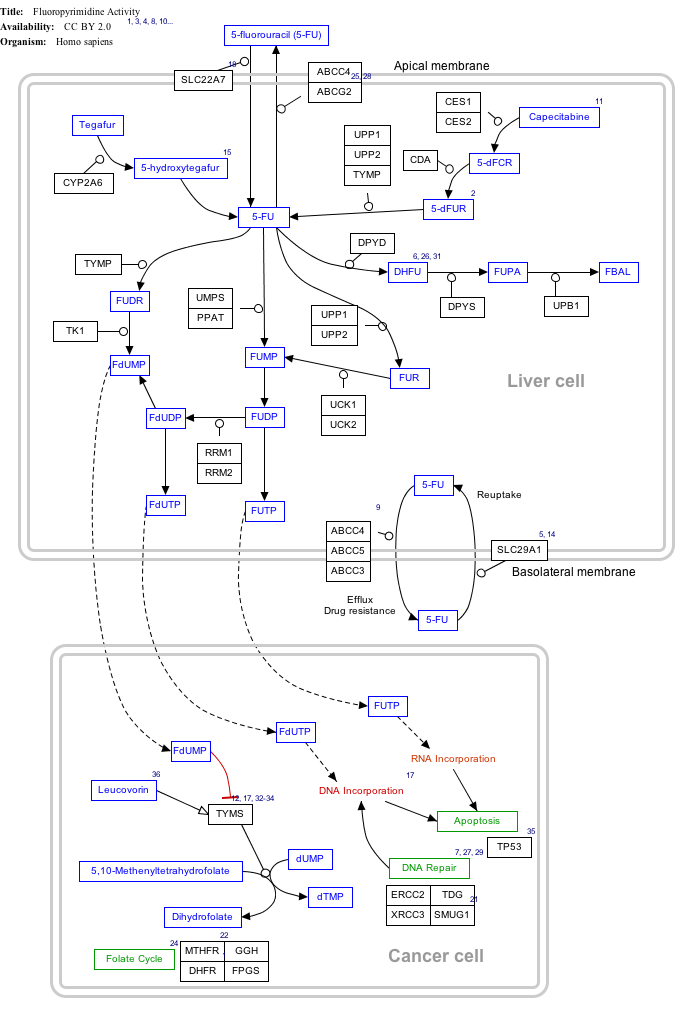

Fluorouracil (5-FU) Activity edit

== See also ==
- Dihydropyrimidine dehydrogenase deficiency, a genetic disorder
- Cancer pharmacogenomics
