= Carbocyclic nucleoside =

Class of chemical compounds

Carbocyclic nucleosides (also referred to as carbanucleosides) are nucleoside analogues in which a methylene group has replaced the oxygen atom of the furanose ring. These analogues have the nucleobase attached at a simple alkyl carbon rather than being part of a hemiaminal ether linkage. As a result, they have increased chemical stability. They also have increased metabolic stability because they are unaffected by phosphorylases and hydrolases that cleave the glycosidic bond between the nucleobase and furanose ring of nucleosides. They retain many of the biological properties of the original nucleosides with respect to recognition by various enzymes and receptors.

Carbocyclic nucleosides were originally limited to a five-membered ring system, matching the ring-size of the nucleosides; however, this term has been broadened to three-, four-, and six-membered rings.

3-, 4-, and 6-membered ring carbocyclic nucleosides

== Natural products ==
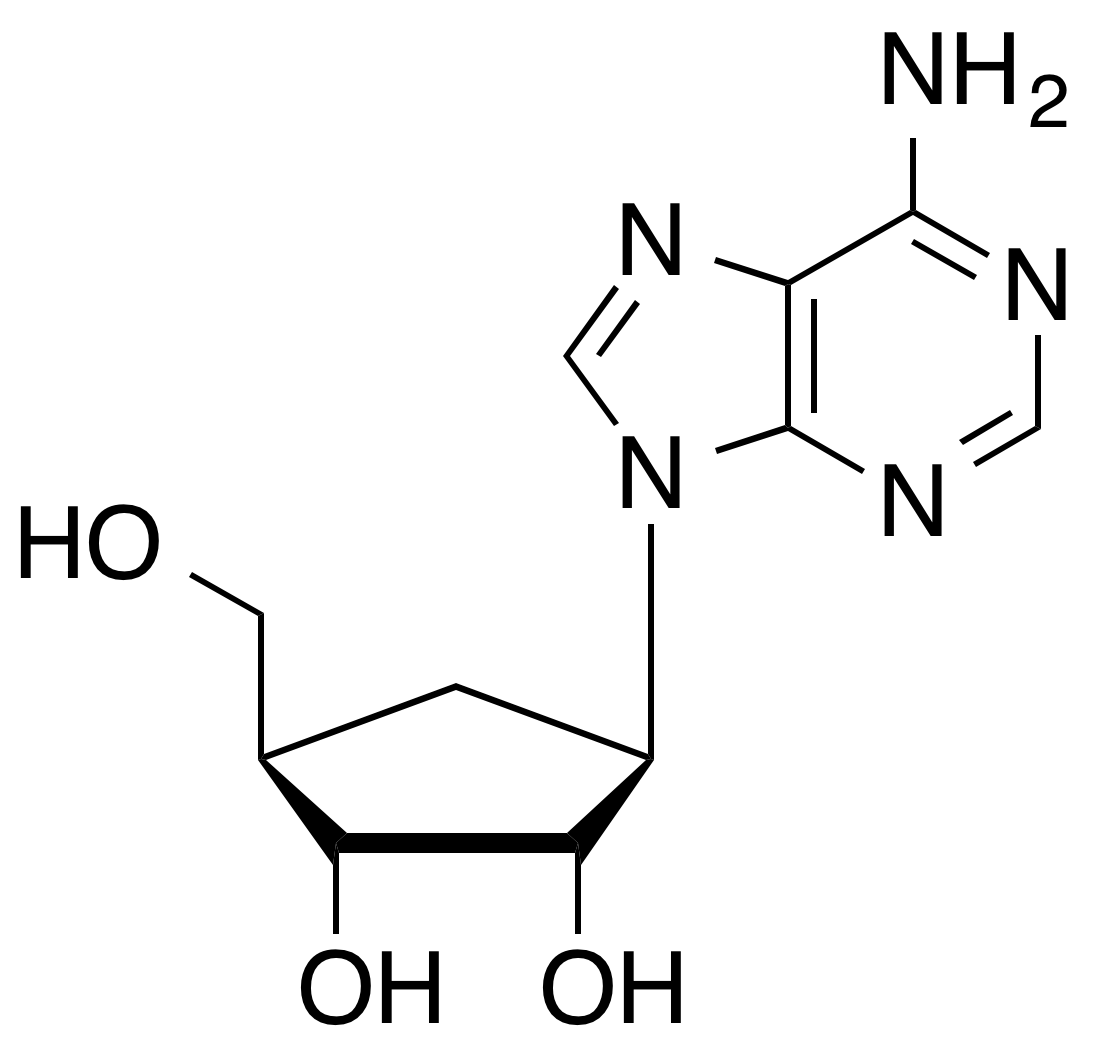
Aristeromycin

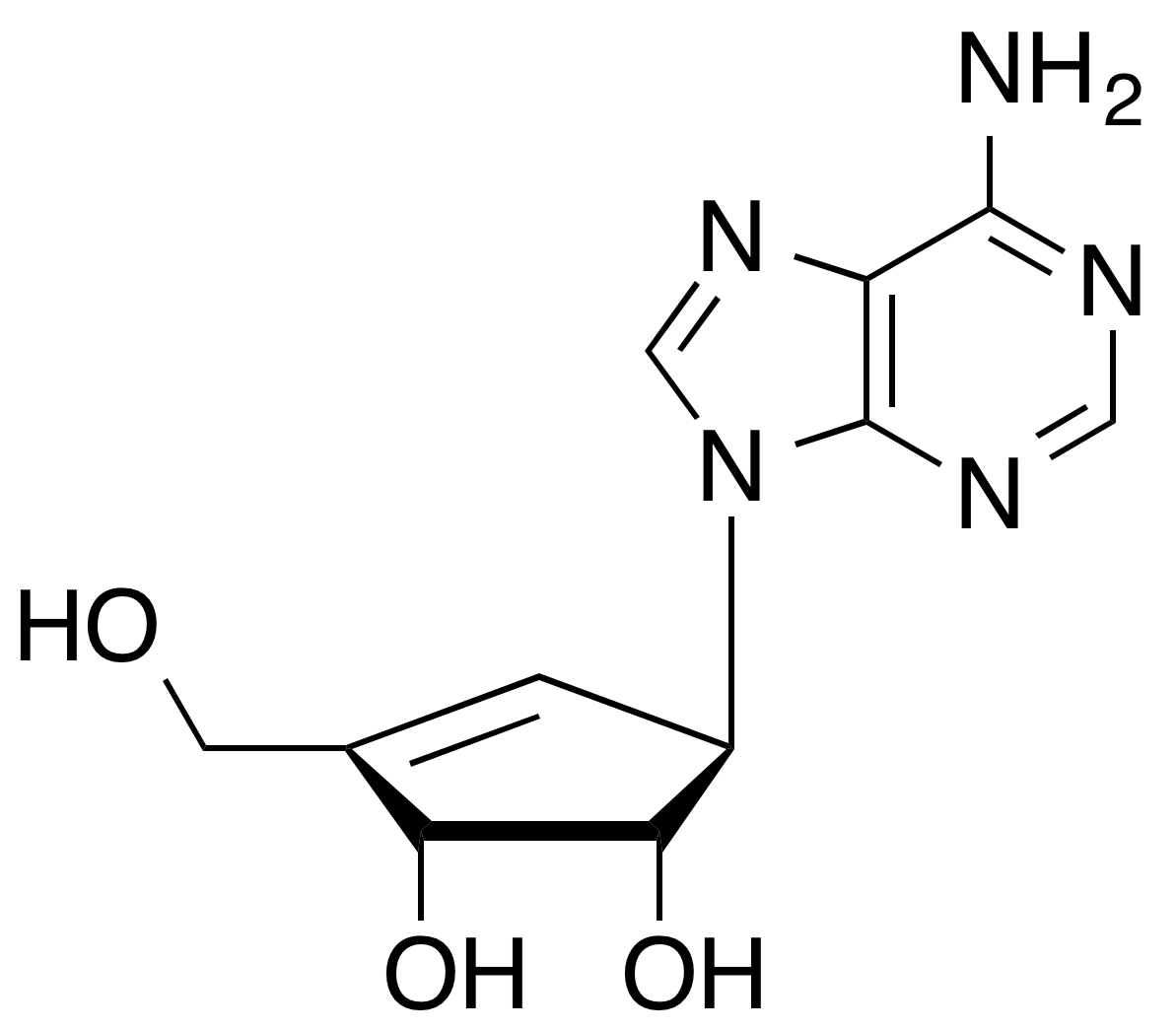
Neplanocin A

The 5-membered ring carbocyclic nucleosides aristeromycin, the analog of adenosine, and neplanocin A, the cyclopentene analog of aristeromycin, have been isolated from natural sources. They both exhibit significant biological activity as antiviral and antitumour agents.

== Classes ==
A large number of novel carbocyclic nucleosides of pyrimidines and purines have been prepared, and many of these compounds are endowed with interesting biological activities.

=== Pyrimidine carbocyclic nucleosides ===
Cyclopentenylcytosine (CPE-C)

C-BVDU

The cyclopentenylcytosine (CPE-C) was developed as a potent antitumor and antiviral agent (phase 1 trials) and exhibited potent anti-orthopoxvirus as well as anti-West Nile virus activities. Carbocyclic (E)-5-(2-bromovinyl)-2-deoxyuridine( (+) C-BVDU) GR95168 possesses activity against herpes simplex virus type l (HSV-1) and varicella zoster virus (VZV, chicken pox and shingles) in-vitro and in-vivo.

=== Purine carbocyclic nucleosides ===
The two guanine antiviral carbocyclic nucleosides, the anti-HIV agent abacavir and the anti-hepatitis B agent entecavir, are reverse-transcriptase inhibitors. Abacavir, was developed from racemic (±)-carbovir which was reported in 1988 by Robert Vince as the first carbocyclic nucleoside analogue to show potent activity against HIV with low cytotoxicity. The (-) enantiomer of carbovir was later shown to be the biologically active form for inhibition of HIV. However carbovir's low aqueous solubility and poor oral bioavailability, as well as inefficient central nervous system penetration prevented it from further developing as an anti-HIV agent. These difficulties were overcome by investigating prodrug analogues of (-) carbovir which lead to the 6-cyclopropylamino-2-aminopurine nucleoside abacavir, which was approved in 1998 by the FDA for the treatment of HIV infection.

Antiviral Carbocyclic Purine nucleosides

(-)Carbovir

Abacavir

Entecavir

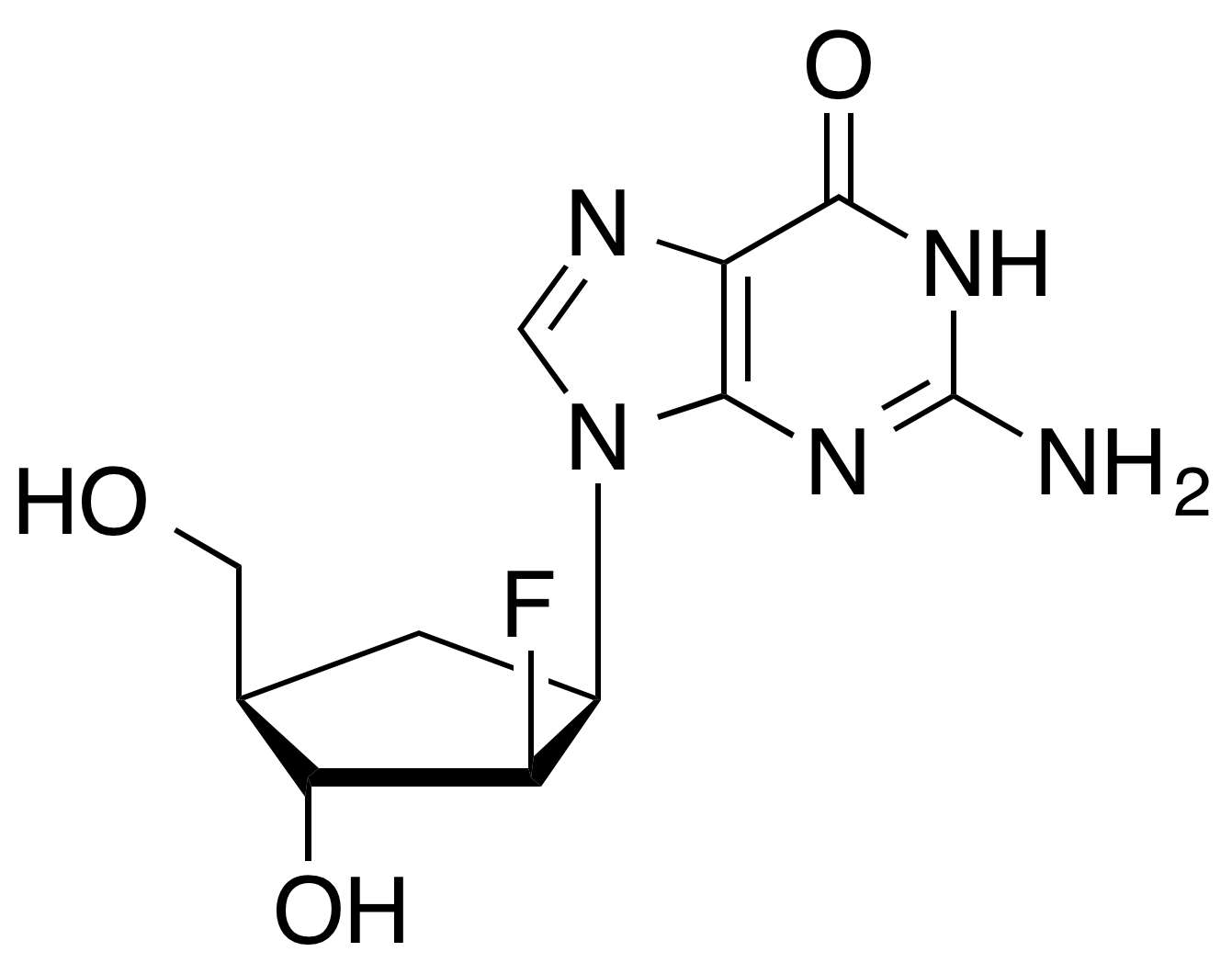
Carbocyclic 2′-ara-fluoro-guanosine

Lobucavir

Entecavir, a guanosine analog, was reported in 1997 as a potent and selective inhibitor for the hepatitis B virus, and approved by the FDA in March 2005 for oral treatment of hepatitis B infection. The fluorocarbocyclic nucleoside carbocyclic 2′-ara-fluoro-guanosine was reported in 1988 as the first example of a carbocyclic analogue of an unnatural nucleoside to exhibit greater anti-herpes activity against the herpesviruses HSV-1 and HSV-2 in-vitro than its furanose parent.

== Synthesis ==
There are two approaches used in the synthesis of carbocyclic nucleosides. Linear approaches to chiral carbocyclic nucleosides 2 rely on the construction of the heterocyclic base onto a suitable protected chiral cyclopentylamine (1 → 2). In the convergent approach the intact heterocyclic base is coupled directly to a suitably protected functionalised carbocyclic moiety (3 → 2).

Linear & Convergent Synthesis of Carbocyclic Nucleosides

== History ==
- 1966: First described synthesis of the racemic (±) carbocyclic analogue of adenosine.
- 1968: The (-) enantiomer, named aristeromycin. was isolated as a metabolite of Streptomyces citricolor.
- 1981: Isolation of the neplanocin family of carbocyclic nucleosides and in particular the cyclopentenyl derivative neplanocin A from Ampukwiella regularis
- 1983: The first enantiospecific synthesis of (-) aristeromycin and (-) neplanocin A
- 1986: The first comprehensive review of carbocyclic nucleosides including the linear chemical syntheses and the biological properties of these early racemic analogues and of the natural products aristeromycin and neplanocin A.
- 1988: The first fluorocarbocyclic nucleoside C-AFG synthesised that was 1000-fold more active than the furanose parent nucleoside against HSV-1 and HSV-2 in-vitro.
- 1988: Review of Glaxo's synthesis of fluorocarbocyclic nucleosides
- 1988: (±)-Carbovir first reported with potent anti-HIV activity and low cytotoxicity
- 1992: First comprehensive review of the synthesis of chiral carbocyclic nucleosides.
- 1994: A review covering the racemic cyclopentyl carbocyclic nucleosides was broadened to include the bioactivity of carbocyclic nucleosides in 1998
- 1997: Abacavir, prodrug of (-)Carbovir reported, approved by the FDA in December 1998, for the treatment of HIV infection under the trade name of Ziagen™.
- 1997: First report of Entecavir (BMS-200475) as potent and selective anti-hepatitis B inhibitor, approved by the FDA in March 2005 for oral treatment of hepatitis B infection. trade names Baraclude or Entaliv.
- 1998: Review of new developments in the enantioselective synthesis of cyclopentyl carbocyclic nucleosides.
- 2003: Review of new progresses in the enantioselective synthesis and biological properties of carbocyclic nucleosides including 3, 4 and 6 membered carbocyclic rings.
- 2011: Review covers the most recent advances in the synthesis and biological activity of carbocyclic nucleosides up to September 2010.
- 2013: Two reviews of the most representative methods of asymmetric synthesis of carbocyclic nucleosides since 1998
- 2014: Review of the synthesis of carbocyclic nucleosides involving ring-closing metathesis (RCM) as a key step.
