= Vince lactam =

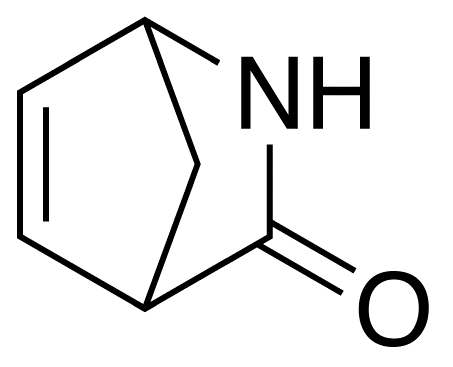

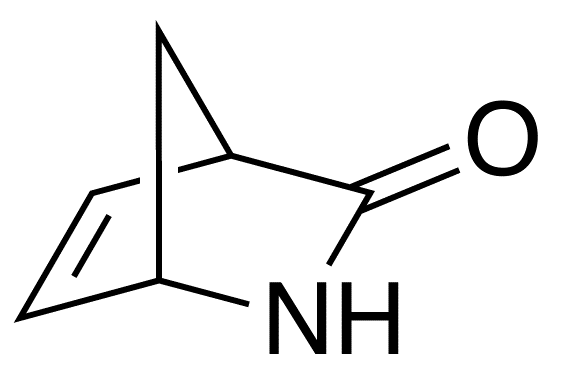

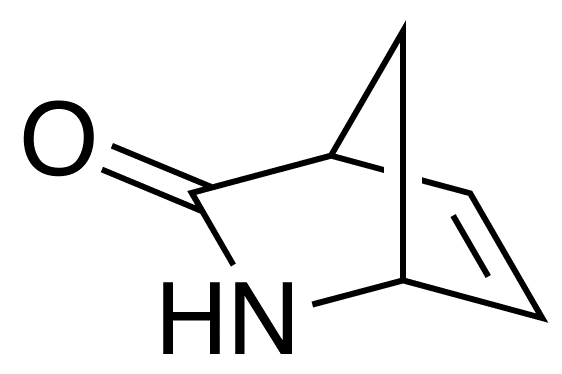

Names
- Preferred IUPAC name 2-Azabicyclo[2.2.1]hept-5-en-3-one

Identifiers
| CAS Number | (1S,4R): 130931-83-8; (1R,4S): 79200-56-9 |
| 3D model (JSmol) | (1S,4R): Interactive image; (1R,4S): Interactive image |
| ChemSpider | (1S,4R): 2007146; (1R,4S): 9963824 |
| EC Number | (1S,4R): 627-840-6; (1R,4S): 418-530-1 |
| PubChem CID | (1S,4R): 11789150; (1R,4S): 2725037 |
| CompTox Dashboard (EPA) | DTXSID401336090; (1R,4S): DTXSID10369337 |
- InChI: (1S,4R): InChI=1S/C6H7NO/c8-6-4-1-2-5(3-4)7-6/h1-2,4-5H,3H2,(H,7,8)/t4-,5+/m0/s1 Key: DDUFYKNOXPZZIW-CRCLSJGQSA-N; (1R,4S): InChI=1S/C6H7NO/c8-6-4-1-2-5(3-4)7-6/h1-2,4-5H,3H2,(H,7,8)/t4-,5+/m1/s1 Key: DDUFYKNOXPZZIW-UHNVWZDZSA-N
- SMILES: (1S,4R): O=C1N[C@@H]2\C=C/[C@H]1C2; (1R,4S): C1[C@H]2C=C[C@@H]1NC2=O

Properties
| Chemical formula | C_{6}H_{7}NO |
| Molar mass | 109.128 g·mol^{−1} |

Hazards
- GHS labelling
| Pictograms | (GHS05: Corrosive) (GHS07: Exclamation mark) |
| Signal word | Danger |
| Hazard statements | H302, H317, H318 |
| Precautionary statements | P261, P264, P270, P272, P280, P301+P312, P302+P352, P305+P351+P338, P310, P321, P330, P333+P313, P363, P501 |
- Except where otherwise noted, data are given for materials in their standard state (at 25 °C [77 °F], 100 kPa). verify (what is ?) Infobox references

Vince lactam is the commercial name given to the bicyclic molecule γ-lactam 2-azabicyclo[2.2.1]hept-5-en-3-one. This lactam is a versatile chemical intermediate used in organic and medicinal chemistry. It is used as a synthetic precursor for three drugs (approved or in clinical trials). It is named after Robert Vince who has used the structural features of this molecule for the preparation of carbocyclic nucleosides. Vince's work with this lactam eventually led to his synthesis of abacavir. Peramivir synthesis is also dependent on Vince lactam starting material.

Vince lactam has been extensively used for the preparation of various carbocyclic nucleosides with medicinal applications in mind, including carbocyclic puromycin (I), carbocyclic Ara-A (II), carbovir (III) and guanine as well as azaguanine carbocyclic derivatives (IV)

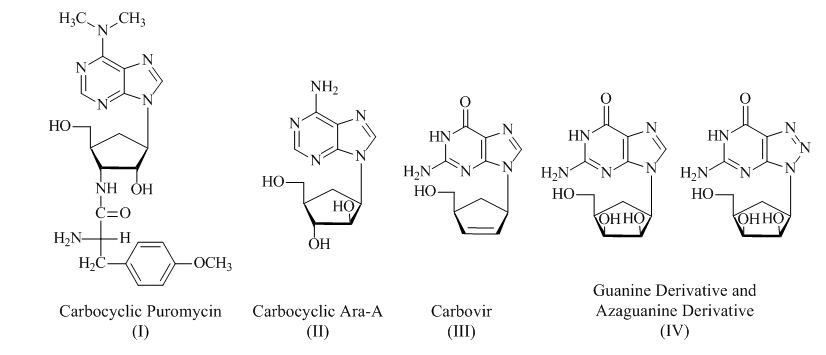

Vince lactam is also an intermediate in the synthesis of various nucleoside analogs such as difluoro guanosine derivatives (V), carbocyclic oxanosine and related derivatives (VI), and precursors for azidocarbonucleosides (VII). The lactam has found several applications in targeting an array of different diseased conditions by providing various non-nucleoside therapeutic molecules as well. Some well known examples include scaffolds for the preparation of glycosidase inhibitors (VIII) and GABA-AT inhibitors (IX).

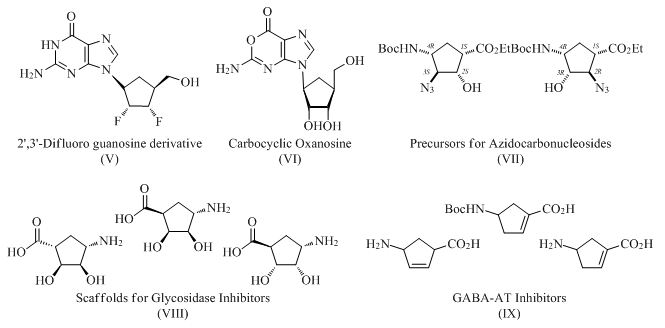
