= Aciclovir =

Antiviral medication used against herpes, chickenpox, and shingles

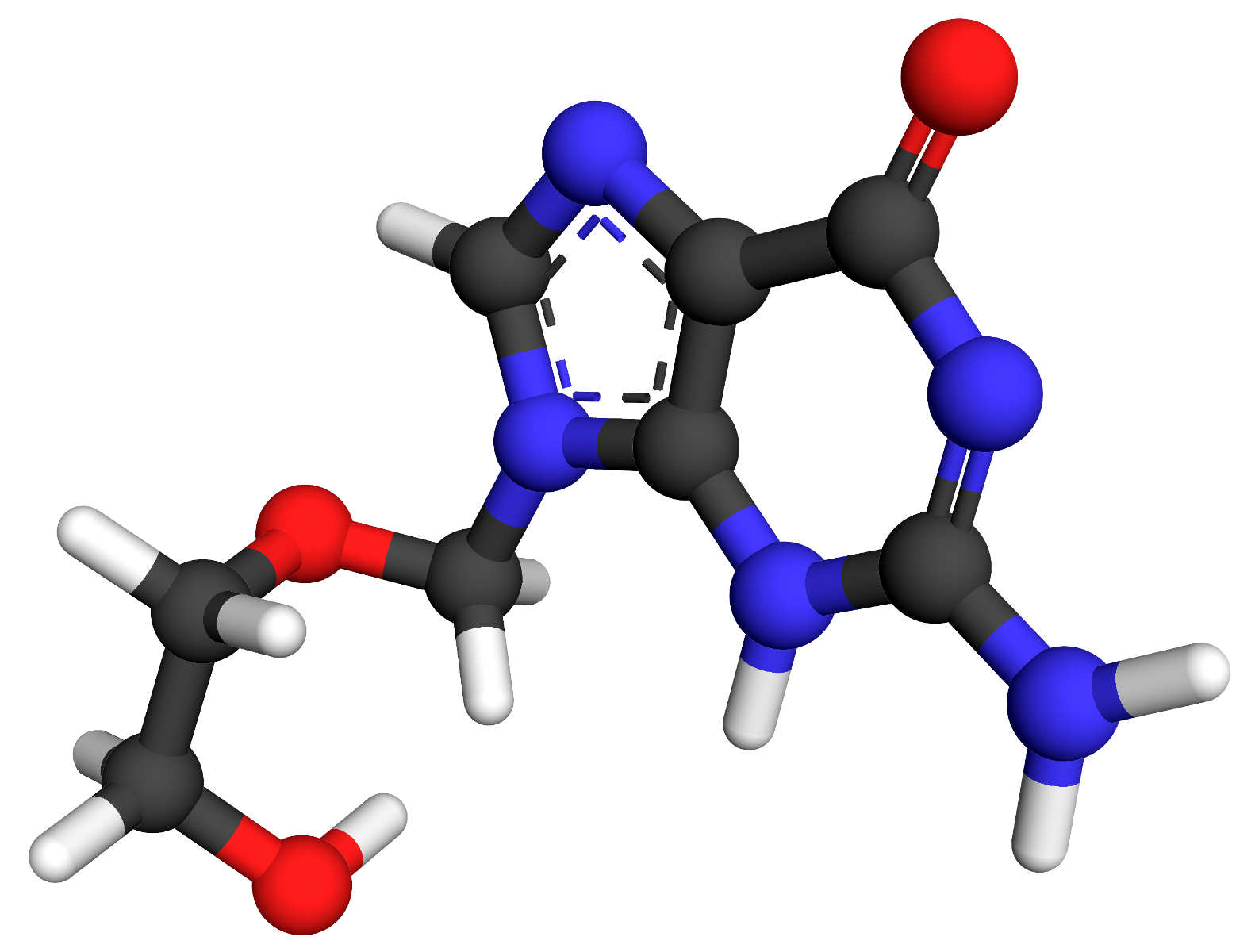

Clinical data
- Pronunciation: /eɪˈsaɪkloʊvɪər/
- Trade names: Zovirax, others
- Other names: Acycloguanosine, acyclovir (BAN UK), acyclovir (USAN US)
- AHFS/Drugs.com: Acyclovir Monograph; Acyclovir topical Monograph
- MedlinePlus: a681045
- License data: US DailyMed: Acyclovir
- Pregnancy category: AU: B3
- Routes of administration: Intravenous, by mouth, topical, eye ointment
- ATC code: J05AB01 (WHO) D06BB03 (WHO), S01AD03 (WHO), D06BB53 (WHO)

Legal status
- Legal status: AU: S4 (Prescription only); CA: ℞-only; UK: POM (Prescription only) Topical preparations available OTC; US: ℞-only

Pharmacokinetic data
- Bioavailability: 15–20% (by mouth)
- Protein binding: 9–33%
- Metabolism: Liver
- Elimination half-life: 2–4 hours
- Excretion: Kidney (62–90% as unchanged drug)

Identifiers
- IUPAC name: 2-amino-1,9-dihydro-9-((2-hydroxyethoxy)methyl)-3H-purin-6-one
- CAS Number: 59277-89-3
- PubChem CID: 2022
- PubChem SID: 46506002
- IUPHAR/BPS: 4829
- DrugBank: DB00787
- ChemSpider: 1945
- UNII: X4HES1O11F
- KEGG: D00222; C06810
- ChEBI: CHEBI:2453
- ChEMBL: ChEMBL184
- PDB ligand: AC2 (PDBe, RCSB PDB)
- CompTox Dashboard (EPA): DTXSID1022556
- ECHA InfoCard: 100.056.059

Chemical and physical data
- Formula: C_{8}H_{11}N_{5}O_{3}
- Molar mass: 225.208 g·mol^{−1}
- 3D model (JSmol): Interactive image
- Melting point: 256.5 °C (493.7 °F)
- SMILES: O=C2/N=C(\Nc1n(cnc12)COCCO)N
- InChI: InChI=1S/C8H11N5O3/c9-8-11-6-5(7(15)12-8)10-3-13(6)4-16-2-1-14/h3,14H,1-2,4H2,(H3,9,11,12,15); Key:MKUXAQIIEYXACX-UHFFFAOYSA-N

Aciclovir, also known as acyclovir, is an antiviral medication. It is primarily used for the treatment of herpes simplex virus infections, chickenpox, and shingles. Other uses include the prevention of cytomegalovirus infections following transplant, and severe complications of Epstein–Barr virus infection. It can be taken by mouth, applied as a cream, or injected.

Common side effects include nausea and diarrhea. Potentially serious side effects include kidney problems and low platelets. Greater care is recommended in those with poor liver or kidney function. It is generally considered safe for use in pregnancy with no harm having been observed. It appears to be safe during breastfeeding. Aciclovir is a nucleoside analogue that mimics guanosine. It works by decreasing the production of the virus's DNA.

Aciclovir was patented in 1974, by Burroughs Wellcome, and approved for medical use in 1981. It is on the World Health Organization's List of Essential Medicines. It is available as a generic medication and is marketed under many brand names worldwide. In 2023, it was the 150th most commonly prescribed medication in the United States, with more than 3 million prescriptions.

== Medical use ==
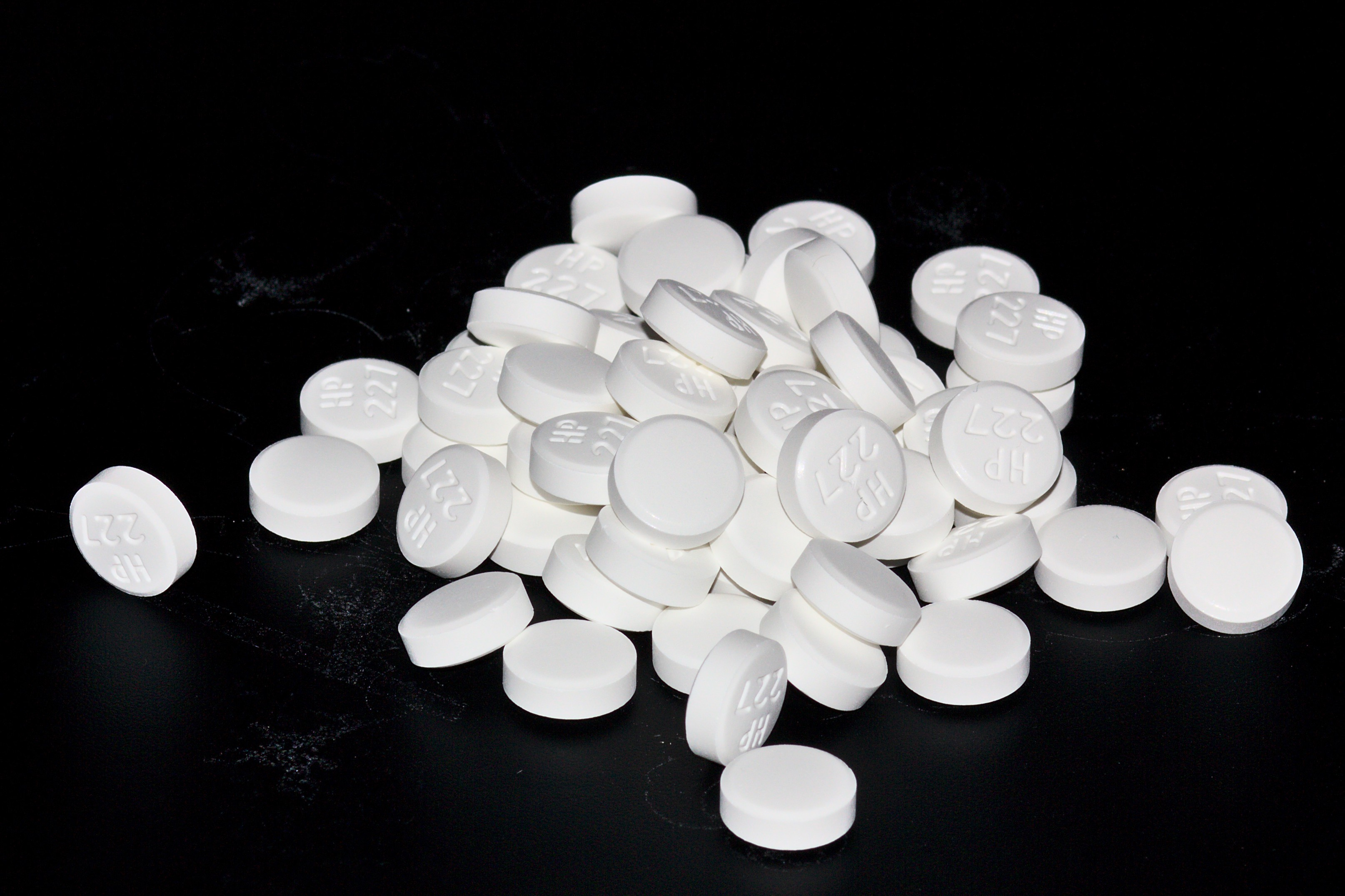
400 mg pills of aciclovir

Aciclovir acts by inhibiting viral DNA replication and is used for the treatment of herpes simplex virus (HSV) and varicella zoster virus infections, including:

- Genital herpes simplex (treatment and prevention)
- Neonatal herpes simplex
- Herpes simplex labialis (cold sores)
- Shingles
- Acute chickenpox in immunocompromised patients
- Herpes simplex encephalitis
- Acute mucocutaneous HSV infections in immunocompromised patients
- Herpes of the eye and herpes simplex blepharitis (a chronic (long-term) form of herpes eye infection)
- Prevention of herpes viruses in immunocompromised people (such as people undergoing cancer chemotherapy)

It has not been found to be effective against Epstein–Barr virus and its associated infectious mononucleosis. Aciclovir risks causing resistance to antiviral agents, and in 1% to 10% of cases can cause unpleasant side effects.

Aciclovir taken by mouth does not appear to decrease the risk of pain after shingles. In those with herpes of the eye, aciclovir may be more effective and safer than idoxuridine. It is unclear if aciclovir eye drops are more effective than brivudine eye drops.

Intravenous aciclovir is effective in treating severe medical conditions caused by different species of the herpes virus family, including severe localized infections of the herpes virus, severe genital herpes, chickenpox and herpesviral encephalitis. It is also effective in systemic or traumatic herpes infections, eczema herpeticum, and herpesviral meningitis. Reviews of research dating from the 1980s show there is some effect in reducing the number and duration of lesions if aciclovir is applied at an early stage of an outbreak. Research shows effectiveness of topical aciclovir in both the early and late stages of the outbreak as well as improving methodologically and in terms of statistical certainty from previous studies. Aciclovir trials show that this agent has no role in preventing HIV transmission, but it can help slow HIV disease progression in people not taking anti-retroviral therapy (ART). This finding emphasizes the importance of testing simple, inexpensive non-ART strategies, such as aciclovir and cotrimoxazole, in people with HIV.

=== Pregnancy ===
The CDC and others have declared that during severe recurrent or first episodes of genital herpes, aciclovir may be used. For severe HSV infections (especially disseminated HSV), IV aciclovir may also be used.

Studies in mice, rabbits, and rats (with doses more than 10 times the equivalent of that used in humans) given during organogenesis have failed to demonstrate birth defects. Studies in rats in which they were given the equivalent to 63 times the standard steady-state human concentrations of the drug (Note: Subject to the same conditions as before) on day 10 of gestation showed head and tail anomalies.

Aciclovir is recommended by the CDC for treatment of varicella during pregnancy, especially during the second and third trimesters.

Aciclovir is excreted in breast milk, therefore it is recommended that caution should be used in breast-feeding women. It has been shown in limited test studies that the nursing infant is exposed to approximately 0.3 mg/kg/day following oral administration of aciclovir to the mother. If nursing mothers have herpetic lesions near or on the breast, breast-feeding should be avoided.

== Adverse effects ==
=== Systemic therapy ===
Common adverse drug reactions (≥1% of patients) associated with systemic aciclovir therapy (oral or IV) include nausea, vomiting, diarrhea, encephalopathy (with IV use only), injection site reactions (with IV use only) and headache. In high doses, hallucinations have been reported. Infrequent adverse effects (0.1–1% of patients) include agitation, vertigo, confusion, dizziness, oedema, arthralgia, sore throat, constipation, abdominal pain, hair loss, rash and weakness. Rare adverse effects (<0.1% of patients) include coma, seizures, neutropenia, leukopenia, crystalluria, anorexia, fatigue, hepatitis, Stevens–Johnson syndrome, toxic epidermal necrolysis, thrombotic thrombocytopenic purpura, anaphylaxis, and Cotard's syndrome.

Intravenous aciclovir may cause reversible nephrotoxicity in up to 5% to 10% of patients because of precipitation of aciclovir crystals in the kidney. Aciclovir crystalline nephropathy is more common when aciclovir is given as a rapid infusion and in patients with dehydration and preexisting renal impairment. Adequate hydration, a slower rate of infusion, and dosing based on renal function may reduce this risk.

The aciclovir metabolite 9-Carboxymethoxymethylguanine (9-CMMG) has been shown to play a role in neurological adverse events, particularly in older people and those with reduced renal function.

=== Topical therapy ===
Aciclovir topical cream is commonly associated (≥1% of patients) with dry or flaking skin or transient stinging/burning sensations. Infrequent adverse effects include erythema or itch. When applied to the eye, aciclovir is commonly associated (≥1% of patients) with transient mild stinging. Infrequently (0.1–1% of patients), ophthalmic aciclovir is associated with superficial punctate keratitis or allergic reactions.

== Drug interactions ==
Ketoconazole: In-vitro replication studies have found a synergistic, dose-dependent antiviral activity against HSV-1 and HSV-2 when given with aciclovir. However, this effect has not been clinically established and more studies need to be done to evaluate the true potential of this synergy.

Probenecid: Reports of increased half-life of aciclovir, as well as decreased urinary excretion and renal clearance have been shown in studies where probenecid is given simultaneously with aciclovir.

Interferon: Synergistic effects when administered with aciclovir and caution should be taken when administering aciclovir to patients receiving IV interferon.

Zidovudine: Although administered often with aciclovir in HIV patients, neurotoxicity has been reported in at least one patient who presented with extreme drowsiness and lethargy 30–60 days after receiving IV aciclovir; symptoms resolved when aciclovir was discontinued.

== Detection in biological fluids ==
Aciclovir may be quantitated in plasma or serum to monitor for drug accumulation in patients with renal dysfunction or to confirm a diagnosis of poisoning in acute overdose victims.

== Mechanism of action ==
Structures of guanosine and aciclovir compared

Mechanisms (HSV DNA polymerase inhibition and HSV DNA incorporation) of acyclovir action

Aciclovir is converted by viral thymidine kinase to aciclovir monophosphate, which is then converted by host cell kinases to aciclovir triphosphate (ACV-TP, also known as aciclo-GTP). ACV-TP is a very potent inhibitor of viral DNA replication. ACV-TP competitively inhibits and inactivates the viral DNA polymerase. Its monophosphate form also incorporates into the viral DNA, resulting in chain termination.

=== Resistance ===
Resistance to aciclovir is rare in people with healthy immune systems but is more common (up to 10%) in people with immunodeficiencies on chronic antiviral prophylaxis (transplant recipients, people with acquired immunodeficiency syndrome due to HIV infection). Mechanisms of resistance in HSV include deficient viral thymidine kinase; and mutations to viral thymidine kinase or DNA polymerase, altering substrate sensitivity.

=== Microbiology ===
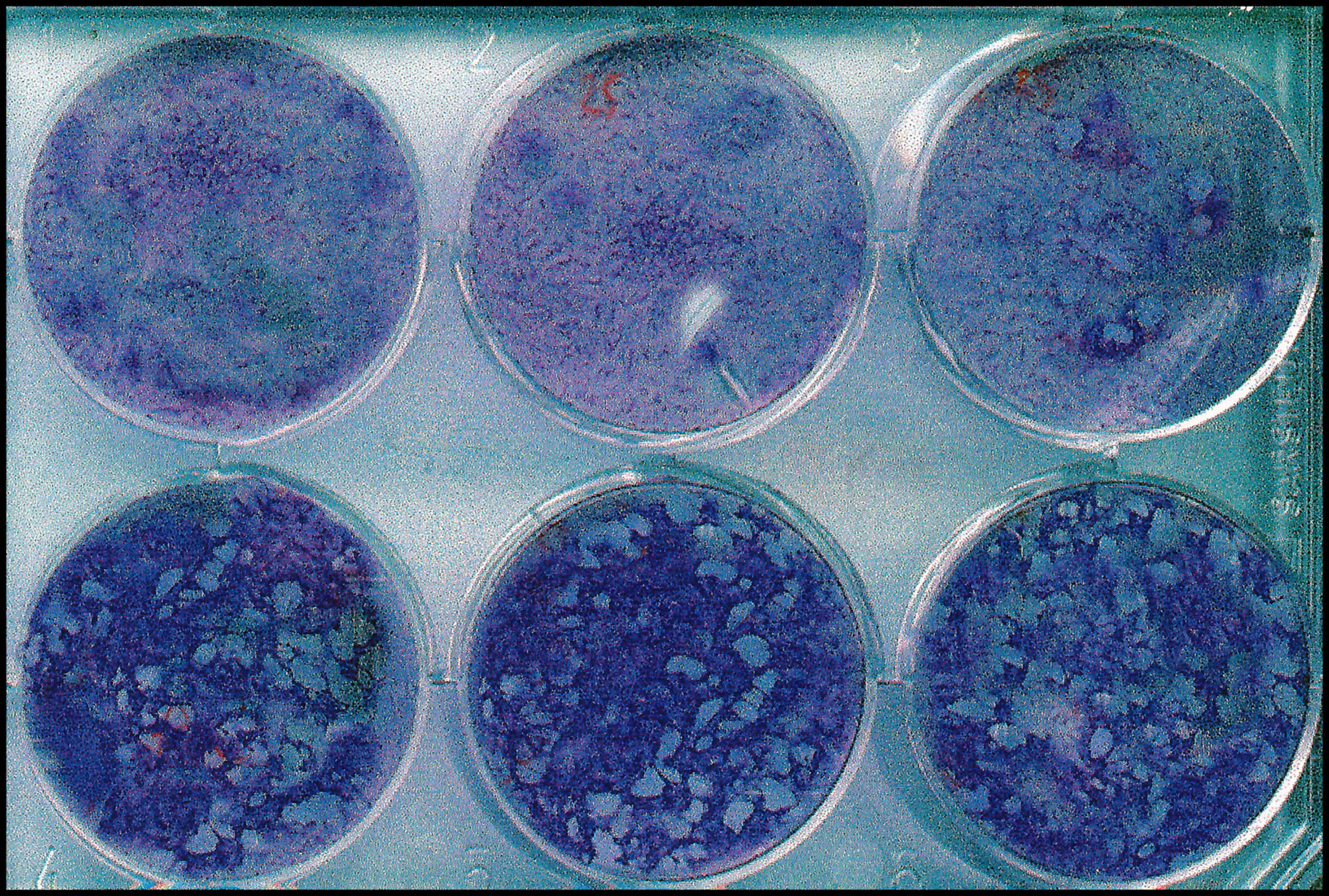
Varicella zoster virus-produced plaques in monolayers of MRC-5 cells. When the virus was reproducing each well contained different amounts of the antiviral drug aciclovir. By counting the plaques (holes formed by the virus in the layer of cells) the potency of the aciclovir to the virus was calculated.

Aciclovir is active against most species in the herpesvirus family. In descending order of activity:

- Herpes simplex virus type I (HSV-1)
- Herpes simplex virus type II (HSV-2)
- Varicella zoster virus
- Epstein–Barr virus
- Human cytomegalovirus – least activity

== Pharmacokinetics ==
Aciclovir is poorly water-soluble and has poor oral bioavailability (15–30%), hence intravenous administration is necessary if high concentrations are required. When orally administered, peak plasma concentration occurs after 1–2 hours. According to the Biopharmaceutical Classification System, aciclovir is a Class III drug, i.e., soluble with low intestinal permeability. Aciclovir has a high distribution rate; protein binding is reported to range from 9 to 33%. The elimination half-life (t_{1/2}) of aciclovir depends according to age group; neonates have a t_{1/2} of 4 hours, children 1–12 years have a t_{1/2} of 2–3 hours whereas adults have a t_{1/2} of 3 hours.

== Chemistry ==
Details of the synthesis of aciclovir were first published by scientists from the University at Buffalo.

In the first step shown, 2,6-dichloropurine was alkylated with 1-benzoyloxy-2-chloromethoxyethane. The chlorine group at the 6-position of the heterocyclic ring is more reactive than the chlorine at the 2-position, hence it can be selectively replaced by an amino group, which was then converted to an amide using nitrous acid. Finally, the remaining chlorine was replaced by the amino group of aciclovir using ammonia in methanol. This synthesis and other methods for preparing the compound have been reviewed.

== History ==
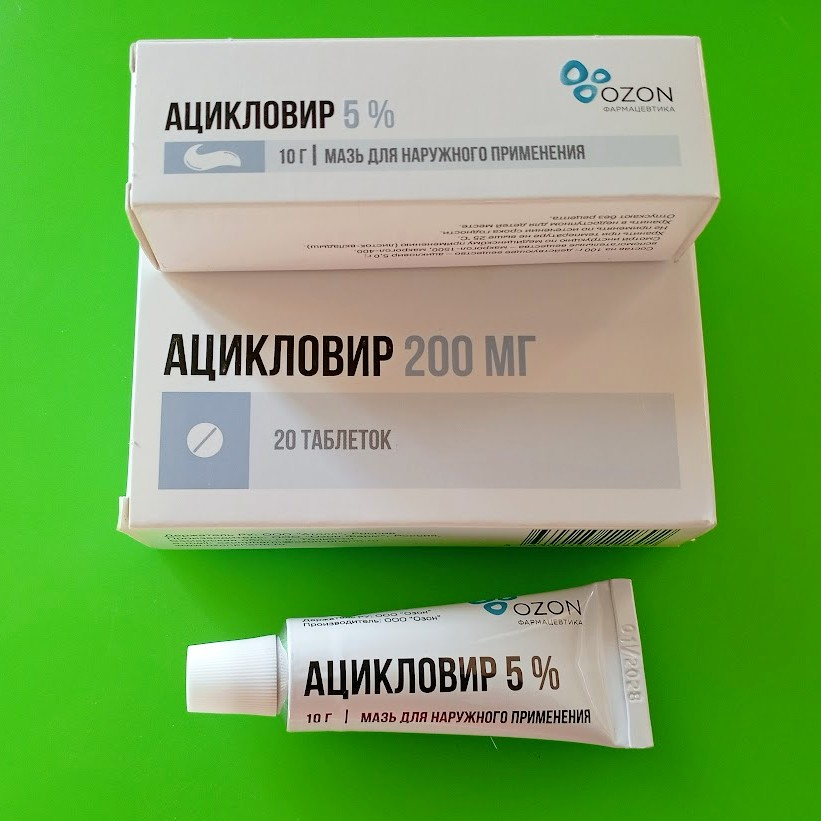
Aciclovir tablets and gel

Aciclovir was seen as the start of a new era in antiviral therapy, as it is extremely selective and low in cytotoxicity. Since the discovery in the mid-1970s, it has been used as an effective drug for the treatment of infections caused by most known species of the herpesvirus family, including herpes simplex and varicella zoster viruses. Nucleosides isolated from a Caribbean sponge, Cryptotethya crypta, were the basis for the synthesis of aciclovir. It was codiscovered by Howard Schaeffer following his work with Robert Vince, S. Bittner and S. Gurwara on the adenosine analog acycloadenosine which showed promising antiviral activity. Later, Schaeffer joined Burroughs Wellcome and continued the development of aciclovir with pharmacologist Gertrude B. Elion. A U.S. patent on aciclovir listing Schaeffer as inventor was issued in 1979. Vince later invented abacavir, an nRTI drug for HIV patients. Elion was awarded the 1988 Nobel Prize in Medicine, partly for the development of aciclovir.

A related prodrug form, valaciclovir came into medical use in 1995. It is converted to aciclovir in the body after absorption.

In 2009, acyclovir in combination with hydrocortisone cream, marketed as Xerese, was approved in the United States for the early treatment of recurrent herpes labialis (cold sores) to reduce the likelihood of ulcerative cold sores and to shorten the lesion healing time in adults and children (six years of age and older).

== Veterinary use ==
Aciclovir is not commonly used in veterinary medicine: there is no evidence of its efficacy for most herpesviruses. In horses the oral bioavailability is just 3% and intravenous use is required to treat equine herpes virus 1. In cats the drug is poorly absorbed and produces toxicity and feline herpes virus 1 is resistant to it.

== Society and culture ==
=== Names ===
It was originally marketed as Zovirax; patents expired in the 1990s and since then it has been generic and is marketed under many brand names worldwide.
