= Herpes simplex encephalitis =

Encephalitis associated with herpes simplex virus

- Other names: Herpes encephalitis, Herpesviral encephalitis
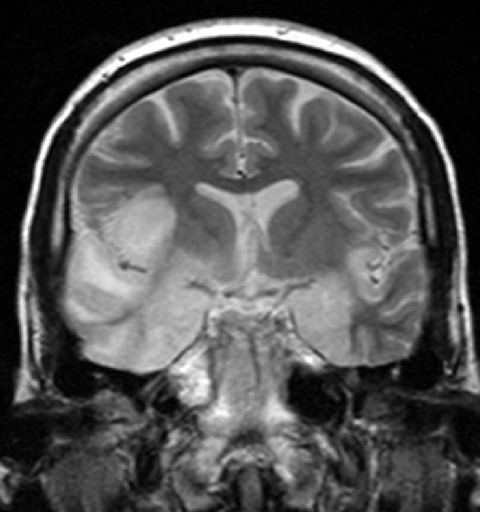
- Coronal T2-weighted MR image shows high signal in the temporal lobes including hippocampal formations and parahippocampal gyrae, insulae, and right inferior frontal gyrus. A brain biopsy was performed and the histology was consistent with encephalitis. PCR was repeated on the biopsy specimen and was positive for HSV
- Specialty: Infectious diseases

Herpes simplex encephalitis (HSE), or simply herpes encephalitis, is a rare form of encephalitis caused by the herpes simplex virus. It is estimated to affect at least 1 in 500,000 individuals per year, and some studies suggest an incidence rate of 5.9 cases per 100,000 live births.

About 90% of cases of herpes encephalitis are caused by herpes simplex virus-1 (HSV-1), the same virus that causes cold sores. According to a 2006 estimate, 57% of American adults were infected with HSV-1, which is spread through droplets, casual contact and sometimes sexual contact, though most infected people never have cold sores. The other 10% of herpes encephalitis cases are due to HSV-2.

Two-thirds of HSE cases occur in individuals already seropositive for HSV-1, few of whom (only 10%) have history of recurrent orofacial herpes, while about one third of cases results from an initial infection by HSV-1, predominantly occurring in individuals under the age of 18. Approximately half of individuals who develop HSE are over 50 years of age.

The most common cause for encephalitis in children and adults is HSV-1. However, encephalitis found in newborns and immunocompromised individuals is mainly caused by HSV-2.

== Signs and symptoms ==
Most individuals with HSE show a decrease in their level of consciousness and an altered mental state presenting as confusion, and changes in personality. Increased numbers of white blood cells can be found in patient's cerebrospinal fluid, without the presence of pathogenic bacteria and fungi. Patients typically have a fever and may have seizures. The electrical activity of the brain changes as the disease progresses, first showing abnormalities in one temporal lobe of the brain, which spread to the other temporal lobe 7–10 days later. Imaging by CT or MRI shows characteristic changes in the temporal lobes (see Figure). After the first symptoms appear, patients might lose their sense of smell. This can also be accompanied by the inability to read, write, or speak coherently, and understand verbal speech.

Definite diagnosis requires testing of the cerebrospinal fluid (CSF) by a lumbar puncture (spinal tap) for presence of the virus. The testing takes several days to perform, and patients with suspected Herpes encephalitis should be treated with acyclovir immediately while waiting for test results. Atypical stroke-like presentation of HSV encephalitis has been described as well, and the clinicians should be aware that HSV encephalitis can mimic a stroke.

=== Associated conditions ===
Herpesviral encephalitis can serve as a trigger of anti-NMDA receptor encephalitis. About 30% of HSE patients develop this secondary immunologic reaction, which is associated with impaired neurocognitive recovery.

== Epidemiology ==
The annual incidence of herpesviral encephalitis is from 2 to 4 cases per 1 million population.

== Pathophysiology ==
HSE is thought to be caused by the transmission of virus from a peripheral site on the face following HSV-1 reactivation, along a nerve axon, to the brain. The virus lies dormant in the ganglion of the trigeminal cranial nerve, but the reason for reactivation, and its pathway to gain access to the brain, remains unclear, though changes in the immune system caused by stress clearly play a role in animal models of the disease. The olfactory nerve may also be involved in HSE, which may explain its predilection for the temporal lobes of the brain, as the olfactory nerve sends branches there. In horses, a single-nucleotide polymorphism is sufficient to allow the virus to cause neurological disease; but no similar mechanism has been found in humans.

== Diagnosis ==
Diagnosis of HSE typically relies on cerebrospinal fluid (CSF) analysis, neuroimaging, and electroencephalography (EEG). Lumbar puncture often finds an elevated opening pressure, high protein levels, normal glucose, and a lymphocytic pleocytosis, sometimes accompanied by red blood cells due to temporal lobe hemorrhage. The historic gold standard diagnostic test for HSE was a brain biopsy; however, the current gold standard is using polymerase chain reaction (PCR) to analyze the CSF for the presence of HSV-1 and HSV-2 viral DNA. While generally considered both highly sensitive (96%) and specific (99%), false-negative PCR results can happen during the first 72 hours of infection, in the presence of interfering substances like blood hemoglobin, or after more than 48 hours of acyclovir therapy. After 10 to 14 days, the presence of intrathecal synthesized HSV-specific IgM antibodies in the CSF is common in patients with HSE. CSF antibodies targeting purified herpesvirus glycoprotein B are also considered highly sensitive (97%) and specific (100%). Blood serology for HSV antibodies is not considered useful for HSE diagnosis due to widespread population exposure to HSV.

Neuroimaging is often used for both the diagnosis and determining the disease extent. Although computed tomography (CT) is frequently performed first to rule out increased intracranial pressure or hemorrhage, it has low sensitivity in early infection and may take several days to reveal characteristic temporal or frontal hypodensities and edema. Magnetic resonance imaging (MRI) is considered much more definitive, offering high sensitivity and displaying characteristic abnormalities on T2 and FLAIR sequences that typically involve the temporal lobes, limbic system, inferior frontal lobes, and insular cortex with a spared basal ganglia. Immunocompromised patients and children, however, can present with more atypical or widespread patterns of brain involvement.

The EEG will also be abnormal in about two-thirds of HSE patients as the affected medial temporal and hippocampal regions become epileptogenic. The abnormal EEG findings that can be present in HSE patients during a 2- to 15-day window include periodic lateralizing epileptiform discharges or sharp-and-slow complexes recurring at consistent intervals of two to three seconds over the temporal regions.

== Treatment ==
Herpesviral encephalitis can be treated with high-dose intravenous acyclovir, which should be infused 10 mg/kg (adult) over 1 hour to avoid kidney failure. In cases where the HSV is resistant to acyclovir, the addition of foscarnet may be considered for off-label use. Without treatment, HSE results in rapid death in approximately 70% of cases; survivors suffer severe neurological damage. When treated, HSE is still fatal in one-third of cases, and causes serious long-term neurological damage in over half of survivors. Twenty percent of treated patients recover with minor damage. Only a small population of untreated survivors (2.5%) regain completely normal brain function.

Earlier treatment (within 48 hours of symptom onset) improves the chances of a good recovery. Rarely, treated individuals can have relapse of infection weeks to months later. There is evidence that aberrant inflammation triggered by herpes simplex can result in granulomatous inflammation in the brain, which responds to steroids. While the herpes virus can be spread, encephalitis itself is not infectious. Other viruses can cause similar symptoms of encephalitis, though usually milder (Herpesvirus 6, varicella zoster virus, Epstein-Barr, cytomegalovirus, coxsackievirus, etc.).
