= Herpes meningitis =

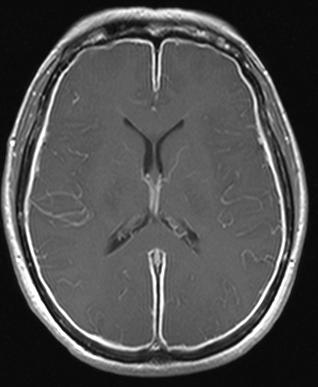
- T1W MRI of the brain demonstrating leptomeningeal enhancement consistent with meningitis
- Specialty: Infectious disease, Neurology
- Symptoms: Headache, fever, neck stiffness, photophobia
- Causes: Viruses of the herpesviridae family
- Diagnostic method: CSF findings, lumbar puncture
- Differential diagnosis: Bacterial meningitis, viral meningitis, fungal meningitis, drug-induced meningitis, CNS abscess, vasculitis
- Treatment: Symptom management, antivirals

Herpes meningitis is inflammation of the meninges, the protective tissues surrounding the spinal cord and brain, due to infection from viruses of the Herpesviridae family - the most common amongst adults is HSV-2. Symptoms are self-limiting over 2 weeks with severe headache, nausea, vomiting, neck-stiffness, and photophobia. Herpes meningitis can cause Mollaret's meningitis, a form of recurrent meningitis. Lumbar puncture with cerebrospinal fluid results demonstrating aseptic meningitis pattern is necessary for diagnosis and polymerase chain reaction is used to detect viral presence. Although symptoms are self-limiting, treatment with antiviral medication may be recommended to prevent progression to Herpes Meningoencephalitis.

== Epidemiology ==
Aseptic meningitis, meningitis caused by pathogens other than bacteria, is the most common form of meningitis with an estimate of 70 cases per 100,000 patients less than 1 year old, 5.2 cases per 100,000 patients 1 to 14 years of age, and 7.6 cases per 100,000 adults. When looking at the most common causes of meningitis, 8.3% are due to herpes simplex virus. HSV-2 specifically is the most common cause of meningitis in adults.

Herpesviral meningitis primarily affects people aged 35–40, the elderly, and women. Between 20% and 50% of cases have clinical recurrences.

== Clinical presentation ==
Common symptoms include nausea, vomiting, neck-stiffness, photophobia, and severe frontal headaches. Patients with meningitis secondary to the HSV-2 virus may also present with genital lesions, although most cases of HSV-2 meningitis occur without symptoms of genital herpes. Around one fifth of people infected with HSV-2 have symptoms of meningitis with their initial infection, more commonly men than women.

== Mollaret's Meningitis ==
HSV-2 is the most common cause of Mollaret's meningitis, a type of recurrent viral meningitis. This condition was first described in 1944 by French neurologist Pierre Mollaret. Recurrences usually last a few days or a few weeks, and resolve without treatment. They may recur weekly or monthly for approximately 5 years following primary infection.

== Diagnosis ==
Differential diagnoses are broad including other causes of meningitis (bacterial, fungal, drug-induced), systemic infection, vasculitis, auto-immune disease, and cancer. As such, patient presentation of fever, headache, stiff neck, and altered mental status is not sufficient information for diagnosis and lumbar puncture must be performed to properly diagnose meningitis. Cerebrospinal fluid findings in herpes meningitis present with lymphocytic pleocytosis, normal glucose, and normal-to-elevated protein.

DNA analysis techniques such as polymerase chain reaction is the gold standard for detection of herpes virus in patient CSF fluid due to high specificity and has been able to detect the HSV-2 virus in patients presenting without genital lesions as well as those experiencing recurrent meningitis.

== Treatment ==
Although guidelines strongly recommend acyclovir for treatment of herpes encephalitis, there are currently no such guidelines for managing herpes meningitis. Herpes meningitis is typically self-limiting over 2 weeks without treatment. However, empirical use of antiviral medications such as acyclovir are considered in cases of suspected HSV meningitis to prevent progression to the more rapid and fatal HSV meningoencephalitis.

HSV-2 is the most common herpes virus that causes meningitis. This virus is transmitted via sexual contact and there are currently no vaccinations or cures for the disease. At the moment, there are no specific programs developed to prevent HSV-2 spread and prevention of disease is primarily done via behavioral modification via condom use or through application of antiviral medications upon infection.

== See also ==
- Herpesviral encephalitis
