= Nucleoside analogue =

Biochemical compound

The antiviral drug aciclovir (bottom), a nucleoside analogue that functions by mimicking guanosine (top)

Nucleoside analogues are structural analogues of a nucleoside, which normally contain a nucleobase and a sugar. Nucleotide analogues are analogues of a nucleotide, which normally has one to three phosphates linked to a nucleoside. Both types of compounds can deviate from what they mimick in a number of ways, as changes can be made to any of the constituent parts (nucleobase, sugar, phosphate). They are related to nucleic acid analogues.

Nucleoside and nucleotide analogues can be used in therapeutic drugs, including a range of antiviral products used to prevent viral replication in infected cells. The most commonly used is acyclovir.

Nucleotide and nucleoside analogues can also be found naturally. Examples include ddhCTP (3ʹ-deoxy-3′,4ʹdidehydro-CTP) produced by the human antiviral protein viperin and sinefungin (a S-Adenosyl methionine analogue) produced by some Streptomyces.

== Function ==
These agents can be used against hepatitis B virus, hepatitis C virus, herpes simplex, and HIV. Once they are phosphorylated, they work as antimetabolites by being similar enough to nucleotides to be incorporated into growing DNA strands; but they act as chain terminators and stop viral DNA polymerase. They are not specific to viral DNA and also affect mitochondrial DNA. Because of this they have side effects such as bone marrow suppression.

There is a large family of nucleoside analogue reverse transcriptase inhibitors, because DNA production by reverse transcriptase is very different from normal human DNA replication, so it is possible to design nucleoside analogues that are preferentially incorporated by the former. Some nucleoside analogues, however, can function both as NRTIs and polymerase inhibitors for other viruses (e.g., hepatitis B).

Less selective nucleoside analogues are used as chemotherapy agents to treat cancer, e.g. gemcitabine. They are also used as antiplatelet drugs to prevent the formation of blood clots, ticagrelor and cangrelor.

== Resistance ==
Resistance can develop quickly with as little as one mutation. Mutations occur in the enzymes that phosphorylate the drug and activate it: in the case of herpes simplex, resistance to acyclovir arises due to a mutation affecting the viral enzyme thymidine kinase. Since nucleoside analogues require two phosphorylations to be activated, one carried out by a viral enzyme and the other by enzymes in the host cell, mutations in viral thymidine kinase interfere with the first of these phosphorylations; in such cases the drug remains ineffective. There are, however, several different nucleoside analogue drugs and resistance to one of them is usually overcome by switching to another drug of the same kind (e.g. famciclovir, penciclovir, valaciclovir).

== Examples ==
Nucleoside analogue drugs include:

- adenosine and deoxyadenosine analogues:
  - didanosine (ddI) — HIV
  - islatravir (ISL) — HIV
  - vidarabine — antiviral
- adenosine analogues:
  - galidesivir — Ebolavirus,
  - remdesivir — Ebolavirus, Marburg virus, Coronavirus
- cytidine and deoxycytidine analogues:
  - cytarabine — chemotherapy
  - gemcitabine — chemotherapy
  - azacitidine — chemotherapy
  - emtricitabine (FTC) — HIV, hepatitis B virus
  - lamivudine (3TC) — HIV, hepatitis B virus
  - zalcitabine (ddC) — HIV
- guanosine and deoxyguanosine analogues:
  - abacavir (ABC) — HIV
  - aciclovir — antiviral
  - entecavir (ETV) — hepatitis B virus
  - ganciclovir — Cytomegalovirus
  - lobucavir — antiviral
  - penciclovir — Herpesvirus
  - ribavirin — antiviral
- thymidine and deoxythymidine analogues:
  - brivudine — Herpesvirus
  - clevudine — hepatitis B virus
  - sorivudine — Herpesvirus
  - stavudine (d4T) — HIV
  - telbivudine (LdT) — hepatitis B virus
  - zidovudine (azidothymidine, AZT) — HIV
- deoxyuridine analogues:
  - idoxuridine — Herpesvirus
  - trifluridine — Herpesvirus

Related drugs are nucleobase analogs, which don't include a sugar or sugar analog, and nucleotide analogues, which also include phosphate groups.

== See also ==
- For nucleoside analogues in biology, see nucleic acid analogues
