= Robert Vince (scientist) =

American scientist (born 1940)

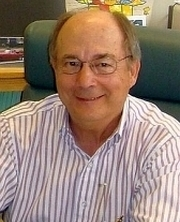
- Born: November 20, 1940 (age 85); Auburn, New York
- Education: SUNY, Buffalo, New York
- Known for: Abacavir, Vince Lactam, Carbovir, Acyclovir

Robert Vince (born November 20, 1940) is an American scientist known for his contributions to the research in the area of drug design. He is currently the director and professor at the Center for Drug Design at the Academic Health Center for the University of Minnesota.

== Biography ==
Robert Vince was born in Auburn, New York. After graduating with a Bachelor of Science in Pharmacy in 1962, Vince joined the research group of Prof Howard J. Schaeffer at SUNY Buffalo in New York, where he obtained his doctoral degree in medicinal chemistry. He subsequently joined the University of Mississippi for a brief stint as assistant professor of medicinal chemistry. In 1967, he joined the medicinal chemistry faculty at the University of Minnesota. In 2002, Vince established the Center for Drug Design within the Academic Health Center of the University of Minnesota, where he continues as director and maintains his research program.

== Career Contributions ==
As a graduate student, Vince’s research on the design of acyclonucleosides, with Howard J. Schaeffer at SUNY Buffalo became an integral part of the discovery of anti-viral drug acyclovir. Later, Prof Schaeffer continued the development of acyclovir at Burroughs Welcome & Company, with pharmacologist Gertrude B. Elion who was awarded the 1988 Nobel Prize in Medicine, in part, for the development of acyclovir. Dr. Vince continued his work on antiviral drug candidates at the University of Minnesota, where he went on to develop carbocyclic nucleosides termed 'carbovirs'. This class of medicinal agents included the drug abacavir. Abacavir was commercialized by GlaxoSmithKline as Ziagen for the treatment of AIDS. Sales from Ziagen have resulted in generation of more than 600 million US dollars in royalties for the University of Minnesota.

His synthesis of abacavir made use of a bicyclic γ-lactam, 2-azabicyclo[2.2.1]hept-5-en-3-one, as a chemical precursor. In recognition of his contribution to the development of this field, Chemical and Engineering News gave this molecule a general name, ‘Vince lactam’ in 2003. Vince lactam has since been utilized to prepare several drugs and pharmaceutical candidates.

== Recognition ==
For his work, Vince has received recognition from several avenues. He was elected as the Fellow of AAAS by The American Association for the Advancement of Science in 2000. He was inducted into the Medicinal Chemistry Hall of Fame of the American Chemical Society in 2007. Vince was awarded Honorary Doctorate of Science Degree by his alma mater SUNY Buffalo, and the prestigious Imbach Townsend Award by the International Society for Nucleosides, Nucleotides and Nucleic Acids, in 2010. The same year, Minnesota Inventor’s Congress inducted him into Minnesota Inventors Hall of Fame, along with Nobel laureate Dr. Norman Borlaug (posthumously). In 2011, he was inducted into Minnesota Science & Technology Hall of Fame. In 2017, the New York State Senate adopted a legislative resolution commending him upon the occasion of his designation as a 2017 Inductee into the Auburn Alumni Hall of Distinction. He was honored at the National Academy of Inventors (NAI) Annual Conference as an NAI Fellow in 2018, and recently was selected for the Innovation Impact Case Award (2022).

- May 2022: Awarded Innovation Impact Case Award 2022
- May 2018: Honored with National Academy of Inventors' Fellow status, Houston, TX
- April 2017: New York State Senate resolution K281, NY
- September 2014: Upper Midwest Regional Emmy Award - Executive Producer, Choo Choo Bob Show - Best Children's Show
- March 2014: Charles W. Hartman Memorial Lecture - 2014, University of Mississippi, MS
- September 2013: Upper Midwest Regional Emmy Award - Executive Producer, Choo Choo Bob Show - Best Children's Show
- February 2013: David Chu Lectureship – 2013, University of Georgia, GA
- November 2011: Inducted into Minnesota Science & Technology Hall of Fame
- September 2010: Inducted into Minnesota Inventors Hall of Fame, along with Nobel laureate Dr. Norman Borlaug (posth.), by the Minnesota Inventor’s Congress
- August 2010: Received 2010 Imbach Townsend Award from the International Society for Nucleosides, Nucleotides and Nucleic Acids
- April 2010: Received Honorary Doctorate of Science Degree from SUNY Buffalo
- September 2009: Elected to the University of Minnesota’s AHC Academy of Excellence in Health Research
- August 2007: Inducted into ACS Medicinal Chemistry Hall of Fame
- 2006: Recognized on ‘Scholars Walk and Wall of Discovery’ at the University of Minnesota
- 2000: Elected as Fellow of AAAS by The American Association for the Advancement of Science
