= Herpesvirus glycoprotein B =

Viral glycoprotein

Herpesvirus Glycoprotein B (PH-like 2)
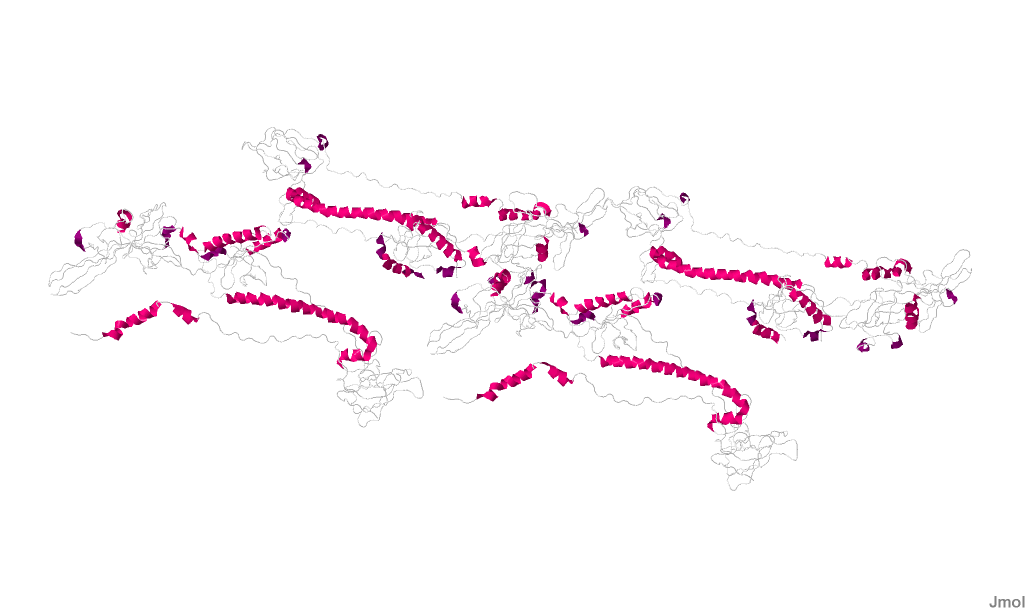
- Crystallographic structure of glycoprotein B from herpes simplex virus type 1.

Identifiers
- Symbol: Glycoprot_B_PH2
- Pfam: PF17417
- InterPro: IPR038631
- OPM superfamily: 109
- OPM protein: 3nw8
Available protein structures:
- PDB: IPR038631 PF17417 (ECOD; PDBsum)
- AlphaFold: IPR038631; PF17417

Herpesvirus Glycoprotein B (PH-like 1)

Identifiers
- Symbol: Glycoprot_B_PH1
- Pfam: PF17416
- InterPro: IPR035377
Available protein structures:
- PDB: IPR035377 PF17416 (ECOD; PDBsum)
- AlphaFold: IPR035377; PF17416

Herpesvirus glycoprotein B ectodomain

Identifiers
- Symbol: Glycoprotein_B
- Pfam: PF00606
Available protein structures:
- PDB: PF00606 (ECOD; PDBsum)
- AlphaFold: PF00606

Herpesvirus glycoprotein B is a viral glycoprotein that is involved in the viral cell entry of Herpes simplex virus (HSV). Herpesviruses have a lipid bilayer, called the envelope, which contains twelve surface glycoproteins. For infectivity to be attained, the double stranded DNA genome of HSV must enter the host cell through means of fusion of its envelope with the cellular membrane or via endocytosis. Other viral glycoproteins involved in the process of viral cell entry include gC, gB, gD, gH, and gL, but only gC, gB, gD, and gH are required for the fusion of the HSV's envelope with the cellular membrane. It can be noted that all herpesviruses have glycoproteins gB, gH, and gL.

== Structure ==
The herpesvirus glycoprotein B is a type-1 transmembrane protein with a signal sequence at its N terminus. The crystal structure of herpes simplex virus (HSV) type-1 and Epstein–Barr virus glycoprotein B ectodomains were solved as a trimer, revealing five structural domains (I-V). Domain I contains two internal fusion loops, thought to insert into the cellular membrane during virus-cell fusion. In HSV, domain II is hypothesized to interact with another herpesvirus glycoprotein, gH/gL, during the fusion process. Domain III consists of a structurally important elongated alpha helix, while domain IV is hypothesized to interact with cellular receptors. Finally, domain V acts in conjunction with domain I during protein-lipid interactions. In HSV, neutralizing monoclonal antibodies map to structural domains I, II, IV and V. Due to its unique structure, herpesvirus glycoprotein B (along with vesicular stomatitis virus glycoprotein G and baculovirus gp64) belongs to a new class of viral membrane fusion glycoproteins, class III.

== Function ==
The herpesvirus glycoprotein B is the most highly conserved of all surface glycoproteins and acts primarily as a fusion protein. The precise functions of gB and gH/gL are unknown but they are required for viral entry into the cell and constitute the core fusion machinery. The claim that gB is involved in fusion comes from the notable syncytial phenotype caused by certain mutations within the cytoplasmic domain of glycoprotein B, as well as its structural homology to other viral fusion proteins.
