= Lobucavir =

Chemical compound

Legal status
- Legal status: US: Investigational New Drug

Identifiers
- IUPAC name: 2-amino-9-[(1R,2R,3S)-2,3-bis(hydroxymethyl)cyclobutyl]-1H-purin-6-one
- CAS Number: 127759-89-1
- PubChem CID: 135413519
- DrugBank: DB12531
- ChemSpider: 54782
- UNII: 8U5PYQ1R2E
- KEGG: D04757
- ChEMBL: ChEMBL23550
- CompTox Dashboard (EPA): DTXSID40155063

Chemical and physical data
- Formula: C_{11}H_{15}N_{5}O_{3}
- Molar mass: 265.273 g·mol^{−1}
- 3D model (JSmol): Interactive image
- SMILES: C1[C@@H]([C@H]([C@@H]1N2C=NC3=C2N=C(NC3=O)N)CO)CO
- InChI: InChI=1S/C11H15N5O3/c12-11-14-9-8(10(19)15-11)13-4-16(9)7-1-5(2-17)6(7)3-18/h4-7,17-18H,1-3H2,(H3,12,14,15,19)/t5-,6-,7-/m1/s1; Key:GWFOVSGRNGAGDL-FSDSQADBSA-N

Lobucavir (previously known as BMS-180194, Cyclobut-G) is an antiviral drug that shows broad-spectrum activity against herpesviruses, hepatitis B and other hepadnaviruses, HIV/AIDS and cytomegalovirus. It initially demonstrated positive results in human clinical trials against hepatitis B with minimal adverse effects but was discontinued from further development following the discovery of increased risk of cancer associated with long-term use in mice. Although this carcinogenic risk is present in other antiviral drugs, such as zidovudine and ganciclovir that have been approved for clinical use, development was halted by Bristol-Myers Squibb, its manufacturer.

== Medical use ==
Lobucavir has been shown to exhibit antiviral activity against herpesvirus, hepatitis B, HIV/AIDS, and human cytomegalovirus. It reached phase III clinical trials for hepatitis B and herpesvirus, phase II clinical trials for cytomegalovirus, and underwent a pilot study for use in treating AIDs prior to discontinuation.

== Adverse effects ==
In early clinical trials, Lobucavir was relatively well tolerated in subjects and was not subject to discontinuation due to adverse effects. Commonly reported effects included headache, fatigue, diarrhea, abdominal pain, and flu-like symptoms common with other nucleoside analogs. Other studies, however, identified Lobucavir-induced carcinogenesis associated with long-term use in mice that led to the drug's discontinuation in clinical trials in 1999.

== Mechanism of action ==
Lobucavir is a guanine analog that interferes with viral DNA polymerase. It must be phosphorylated into its triphosphate form within infected cells via intracellular enzymes before it can demonstrate its anti-viral activity. In hepatitis B studies, Lobucavir has been found to inhibit viral primer synthesis, reverse-transcription, and DNA-dependent DNA polymerization by acting as a non-obligate chain terminator of the viral polymerase. Unlike traditional chain terminators that lack a 3'-OH group to prevent further DNA replication, Lobucavir is thought to cause a conformational change that blocks optimal polymerase activity two to three nucleotides downstream of its incorporation. Its mechanism of action has been found to be similar in use against human cytomegalovirus.

== Pharmacokinetics ==
Lobucavir's bioavailability is 30-40% of the original oral dose and its half-life is approximately 10 hours, as demonstrated by pre-clinical testing
