= Negative campaigning =

Campaign strategy focused on attacking other alternatives

Negative campaigning is the process of deliberately spreading negative information about someone or something to damage their public image. A colloquial and more derogatory term for the practice is mudslinging.

Deliberate spreading of such information may be motivated either by a genuine desire to warn others against real dangers or deficiencies, or by the campaigner's dishonest attempt to win in political, business or other spheres of competition against an honest rival. However, if the mudslinging statements can be proved to be correct, mudslinging takes the moral dimension of an opponent's duty serving the greater good by exposing the weakness of the other candidate.

The public image of an entity can be defined as reputation, esteem, respect, acceptance of the entity's appearance, values and behaviour by the general public of a given territory and/or a social group, possibly within time limits. As target groups of public and their values differ, so negativity or positivity of a public image is relative; thus, to be successful, negative campaigning has to take into account current values of the group it addresses. The degree of strictness in practicing the group's values as opposed to its tolerance for violating the norms has also to be taken into consideration.

== Techniques ==
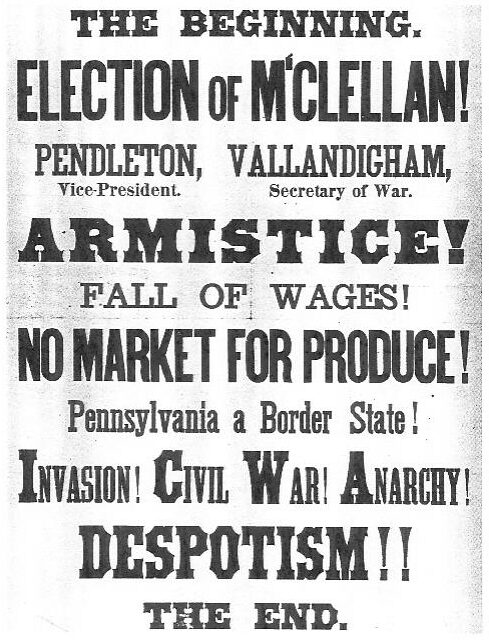
Poster attacking the Democratic Party ticket in the run-up to the 1864 United States presidential election

There are a number of techniques used in negative campaigning. The most standard form of negative campaigning is campaign advertising that serves as an attack on an opponent's personality, record, or opinion. There are two main types of ads used in negative campaigning: attack and contrast.

Attack ads focus exclusively on the negative aspects of the opponent. There is no positive content in an attack ad, whether it is about the candidate or the opponent. Attack ads usually identify the risks associated with the opponent, often exploiting people's fears to manipulate. Because attack ads have no positive content, they have the potential to be more influential than contrast ads in shaping voters’ views of the sponsoring candidate's opponent. One of the most famous attack ads was Daisy Girl by the campaign of Lyndon B. Johnson that successfully portrayed Republican Barry Goldwater as threatening nuclear war. Common attack ad themes include painting an opponent as soft on criminals, dishonest, corrupt, or a danger to the nation. Another relatively common theme is attacking the other side for running a negative campaign.

Unlike attack ads, contrast ads contain information about both the candidate and the opponent. The information about the candidate is positive, while the information about the opponent is negative. Contrast ads compare and contrast the candidate with the opponent, juxtaposing the positive information about the candidate with the negative information of the opponent. Because contrast ads must contain positive information, contrast ads are seen as less damaging to the political process than attack ads.

Push polls are attacks disguised as telephone polls. They might ask a question like "How would you react if Candidate A was revealed to beat his wife?", giving the impression that Candidate A might beat his wife. Members of the media and of the opposing party are deliberately not called making these tactics all but invisible and unprovable.

Dirty tricks are also common in negative political campaigns. These generally involve secretly leaking damaging information to the media. This isolates a candidate from backlash and also does not cost any money. The material must be substantive enough to attract media interest, however, and if the truth is discovered it could severely damage a campaign. Other dirty tricks include trying to feed an opponent's team false information hoping they will use it and embarrass themselves.

Often a campaign will use outside organizations, such as lobby groups, to launch attacks. These can be claimed to be coming from a neutral source and if the allegations turn out not to be true the attacking candidate will not be damaged if the links cannot be proven. Negative campaigning can be conducted by proxy. For instance, highly partisan ads were placed in the 2004 U.S. presidential election by allegedly independent bodies like MoveOn.org and Swift Boat Veterans for Truth.

== Advantages ==
Sponsors of overtly negative campaigns often cite reasons to support mass communication of negative ideas. The Office of National Drug Control Policy uses negative campaigns to alert the public about serious health risks. Similar negative campaigns have been used to rebut mass marketing by tobacco companies or to discourage drunk driving. In politics, proponents of negative campaigning argue that voters have a right to know the truth about a candidate even if the information is unfavorable. In other words, if an opponent is crooked or unethical, then the public should be informed of the same.

Martin Wattenberg and Craig Brians, of the University of California, Irvine, considered in their study whether negative campaigning mobilizes or alienates voters. They concluded that data used by Stephen Ansolabehere in a 1994 American Political Science Review article to advance the hypothesis that negative campaigning demobilizes voters was flawed.

A subsequent study done by Ansolabehere and Shanto Iyengar in 1995 corrected some of the previous study's flaws. This study concluded that negative advertising suppressed voter turnout, particularly for Independent voters. They speculated that campaigns tend to go negative only if the Independent vote is leaning toward the opponent. In doing so, they insure that the swing voters stay home, leaving the election up to base voters. They also found that negative ads have a greater impact on Democrats than on Republicans. According to them, base Republicans will vote no matter what (and will vote only for a Republican), but Democrats can be influenced to either stay home and not vote at all or to switch sides and vote for a Republican. This, combined with the effect negativity has on Independents, led them to conclude that Republicans benefit more from going negative than Democrats.

Other researchers have found different, more positive outcomes from negative campaigns. Rick Farmer, PhD, an assistant professor of political science at the University of Akron found that negative ads are more memorable than positive ads when they reinforce a preexisting belief and are relevant to the central issues of a marketing campaign. Researchers at the University of Georgia found the impact of negative ads increases over time, while positive ads used to counteract negative ads lack the power of negative ads. Research also suggests negative campaigning introduces controversy and raises public awareness through additional news coverage.

Kyle Mattes and David P. Redlawsk in The Positive Case for Negative Campaigning show through surveys and experiments that negative campaigning may provide informational benefits for voters. Without negativity, voters would not have full information about all of their choices, since no candidate will say anything bad about herself. They argue that candidates have to point out the flaws in their opponents for voters to be fully informed.

Most recent research distinguishes between a dichotomous (positive versus negative) and graded conceptualization of negative campaigning. The latter accounts for differences in the strength of negative communication. It argues that positive (i.e. information about parties and candidates) and derogatory (i.e. democratic disaffection) effects of negative campaigning will depend on the strength or intensity of negative campaigning. Similarly, political candidates and parties have been found to adapt the strength of their negative messages during election campaigns in order to preserve the chances for post-electoral collaboration in countries with frequent coalition governments.

== Risks and consequences ==
Some strategists say that an effect of negative campaigning is that while it motivates the base of support it can alienate centrist and undecided voters from the political process, reducing voter turnout and radicalizing politics. In a study done by Gina Garramone about how negative advertising affects the political process, it was found that a consequence of negative campaigning is greater image discrimination of the candidates and greater attitude polarization. While positive ads also contributed to the image discrimination and attitude polarization, Garramone found that negative campaigning played a more influential role in the discrimination and polarization than positive campaigning.

Negative ads can produce serious backlash. A disastrous ad was run by the Progressive Conservative Party of Canada in the 1993 Canadian federal election, apparently emphasizing Liberal Party of Canada leader Jean Chrétien's partial facial paralysis, which was caused by Bell's palsy, in a number of unflattering photos, with the subtext of criticizing his platforms. Chrétien took maximum advantage of the opportunity to gain the public's sympathy as a man who struggled with a physical disability and his party's subsequent overwhelming victory in the election helped reduce the governing Progressive Conservatives to two seats, along with losing official party status.

A similar backlash happened to the Liberal Party in the 2006 federal election for running an attack ad that suggested that Conservative leader Stephen Harper would use Canadian soldiers to patrol Canadian cities, and impose some kind of martial law. The ad was only available from the Liberal Party's web site for a few hours prior to the release of the attack ads on television; nevertheless, it was picked up by the media and widely criticized for its absurdity, in particular the sentence "we're not making this up; we're not allowed to make this stuff up". Liberal MP Keith Martin expressed his disapproval of "whoever the idiot who approved that ad was," shortly before Liberal leader Paul Martin (no relation) stated that he had personally approved them. The effect of the ads was to diminish the credibility of the party's other attack ads. It offended many Canadians, particularly those in the military, some of whom were fighting in Afghanistan at the time. (See 2006 Canadian federal election)

In the 2008 US Senate race in North Carolina, Republican incumbent Elizabeth Dole attempted an attack ad on Democratic challenger Kay Hagan, who had taken a small lead in polls, by tying her to atheists. Dole's campaign released an ad questioning Hagan's religion and it included a voice saying "There is no God!" over a picture of Kay Hagan's face. The voice was not Hagan's but it is believed the ad implied that it was. Initially, it was thought the ad would work as religion has historically been a very important issue to voters in the American south, but the ad produced a backlash across the state and Hagan responded forcefully with an ad saying that she was a Sunday school teacher and was a religious person. Hagan also claimed Dole was trying to change the subject from the economy (the ad appeared during the Great Recession). Hagan's lead in polls doubled and she won the race by a nine-point margin.

Because of the possible harm that can come from being seen as a negative campaigner, candidates often pledge to refrain from negative attacks. This pledge is usually abandoned when an opponent is perceived to be "going negative," with the first retaliatory attack being, ironically, an accusation that the opponent is a negative campaigner.

While some research has found advantages and other has found disadvantages, some studies find no difference between negative and positive approaches.

Research published in the Journal of Advertising found that negative political advertising makes the body want to turn away physically, but the mind remembers negative messages. The findings are based on research conducted by James Angelini, professor of communication at the University of Delaware, in collaboration with Samuel Bradley, assistant professor of advertising at Texas Tech University, and Sungkyoung Lee of Indiana University, which used ads that aired during the 2000 presidential election. During the study, the researchers placed electrodes under the eyes of willing participants and showed them a series of 30-second ads from both the George W. Bush and Al Gore campaigns. The electrodes picked up on the "startle response," the automatic eye movement typically seen in response to snakes, spiders and other threats. Compared to positive or neutral messages, negative advertising prompted greater reflex reactions and a desire to move away.

== Causes ==
Studies have shown a variety of different negativity's predictors. Some of the negativity's drivers stated are: The attacker's personality traits (Big Five, Dark Triad, Populism), the media environment, and election-related factors (competitiveness, a candidate's rank in polls, type of election, party system).

== Notable examples ==
=== United States ===
In United States politics, negative campaigning has been called "as American as Mississippi mud" and "as American as apple pie". Some research suggests negative campaigning is the norm in all political venues, mitigated only by the dynamics of a particular contest. Lee Atwater, best known for being an advisor to presidents Ronald Reagan and George H. W. Bush, also pioneered many negative campaign techniques seen in political campaigns today.

"Daisy" advertisement

- 1828: The Coffin Handbills used by supporters of John Quincy Adams against Andrew Jackson in the 1828 presidential campaign.
- 1934: Unethical campaign tactics were used against Upton Sinclair in the California gubernatorial election.
- 1936: The first radio advertising using negative campaigning came from the Republican Party in 1936.
- 1964: The Daisy ad used by Lyndon Johnson against Barry Goldwater in the 1964 United States presidential election
- 2008: Hillary Clinton's "Children" ad questioning the crisis management abilities of her opponent, Barack Obama.
- 2008: Elizabeth Dole's ad against Democratic challenger Kay Hagan in her 2008 Senate re-election campaign, where Hagan was said to be "Godless", as an attack to the lack of religious piety of her opponent. The ad backfired, as it sharply reduced support for Dole. Dole was defeated by Hagan in the election.
- 2012–present: Nicknames used by Donald Trump before, during, and after his presidency.
- 2014: Justin Amash was smeared as "Al-Qaeda's best friend in Congress" by his primary opponent Brian Ellis.

=== Elsewhere ===
- Argentina: In the 2023 Argentine general election, the governing Unión por la Patria launched various fearmongering ads during one of the worst economic crisis of the history of the nation, in which they claimed economic crisis and human rights would worsen if they're not voted.
- New Zealand: In the 1975 New Zealand general election, the opposing National Party launched the infamous "Dancing Cossacks" television advertisement. Animated by Hanna Barbera, the attack advert claimed the incumbent Labour Party's recently introduced compulsory superannuation scheme could eventually lead to Soviet-style communism.
- Canada: In the 1993 Canadian federal election, the Progressive Conservative Party launched attack ads that were widely seen to be mocking opposing candidate Jean Chrétien's facial deformity. See: 1993 Chrétien attack ad
- United Kingdom: During the run up to the 1997 general election, the Conservative Party ran a campaign that stated that the Labour Party was dangerous and used posters of Labour leader Tony Blair with "demon eyes" on them titled "New Labour, New Danger" (in reference to the New Labour slogan). The campaign failed as Labour won a landslide victory, ending 18 years of Conservative government.
- Mexico: in the 2006 presidential election, Felipe Calderón, president from 2006 to 2012, launched TV ads that stated his opponent, Andrés Manuel López Obrador, was "a danger to Mexico". To this day, López Obrador continues blaming the negative campaign for his defeat and saying that it was part of a conspiracy that the Mexican business elite planned against him.
- Canada: In the 2008 Canadian federal election, the Conservative Party released an ad featuring Opposition Leader Stéphane Dion being defecated on by an animated puffin. Harper later apologized for the ad.
- In the Crewe and Nantwich By-election in 2008, The Labour Party ran a personal class-based campaign against the Conservative candidate Edward Timpson, calling him "the Tarporley Toff", "Lord Snooty", "Tory Boy Timpson". Labour supporters donned top hats to mock Timpson, whose family own a national shoe repair and key-cutting business. The campaign was very poorly received and was condemned as negative and xenophobic by Conservative leader David Cameron.
- Serbia: In the 2018 Belgrade City Assembly election, the ruling party SNS launched a negative campaign against two candidates, Aleksandar Šapić and Dragan Đilas. In a TV political ad they were portrayed as tycoons and criminals who are too busy protesting against Aleksandar Vučić and meeting other criminals than attending meetings. The advertisement caught the attention of REM, which resulted in a suspend of the advertisement.
- Philippines: then-vice presidential candidate Antonio Fuentes Trillanes IV aired a negative ad against then-presidential candidate Rodrigo Duterte in the tail end of the 2016 Philippine general election highlighting his public obscenity.
- Poland: Chairman of the Polish public broadcaster TVP, Jacek Kurski aired a negative claim against then-presidential candidate Donald Tusk during 2005 Polish presidential election falsely claiming that his grandfather had briefly fought in Hitler's army.

== See also ==
- Ad hominem – Attacking the person rather than their argument
- Defamation – Communication causing harm to reputation
- Opposition research – Political negative campaigning practice
- Smear campaign – Effort to damage someone's reputation
- Tu quoque – Fallacy regarding hypocrisy
- Outline of democracy – Overview of and topical guide to democracy
