= Attack ad =

Political ad meant to insult an opposing candidate or party

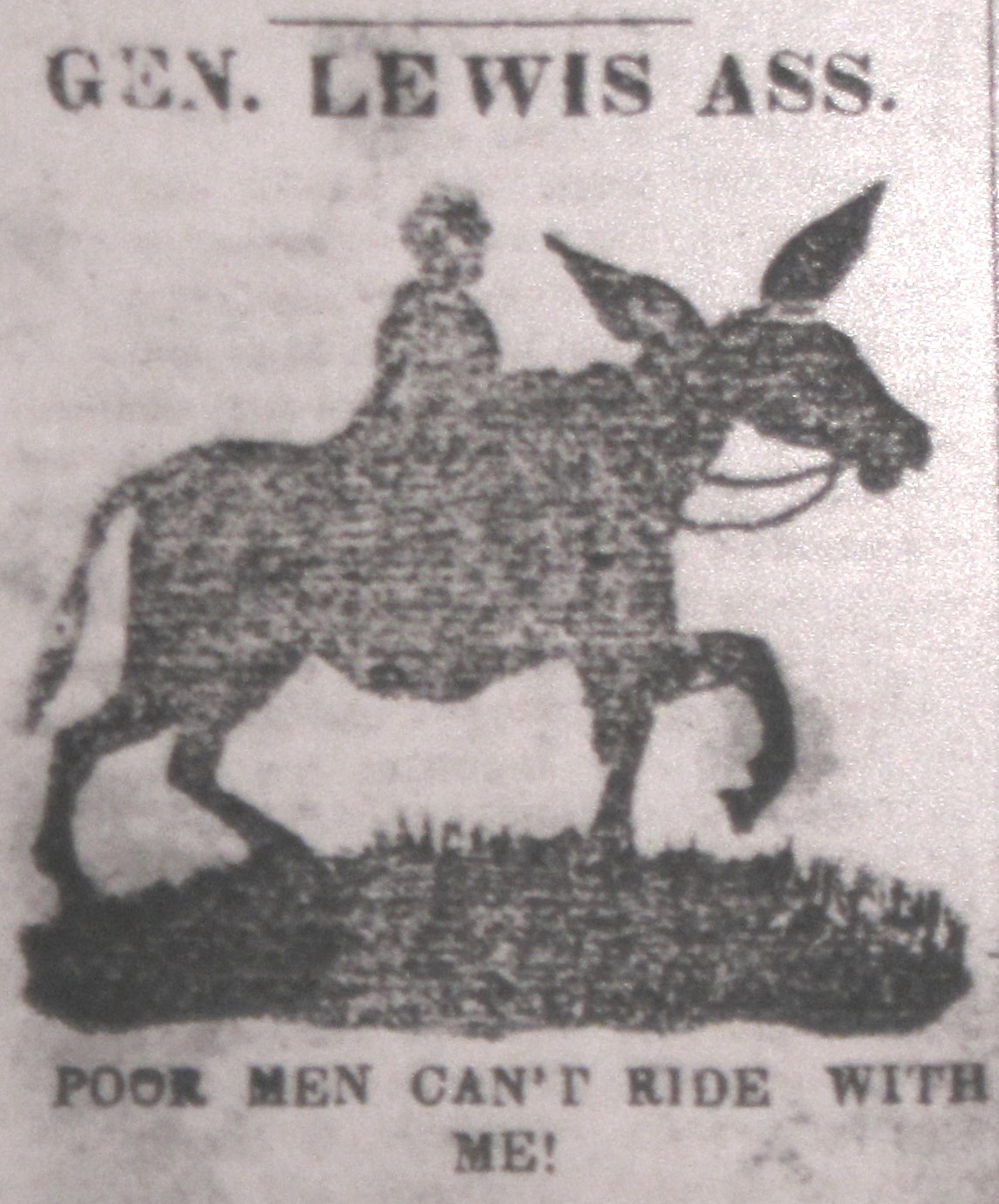
An attack ad in an 1848 issue of the Jonesborough Whig attacking US presidential candidate Lewis Cass

In political campaigns, an attack ad is an advertisement designed to wage a personal attack against an opposing candidate or political party in order to gain support for the attacking candidate -- generally designed to accomplish this by depressing support for the candidate or party being attacked. Attack ads often form part of negative campaigning or smear campaigns, and in large or well-financed campaigns, may be disseminated via mass media.

An attack ad will generally unfairly criticize an opponent's political platform, usually by pointing out its faults. Often the ad will simply make use of innuendo, based on opposition research. Political attack ads across all types of media can have different strategic aims. Some are character attacks, trying to persuade the viewer to think differently about a candidate's character in hopes that they will reconsider their perception of the candidate and who they are as a person. Another strategy is an attack on the candidate's policy or political ideas. This attempts to derail one's support for a candidate by persuading them that the candidate-under-attack's political ideas are illogical, extreme, or will be ineffective.

Televised attack ads rose to prominence in the United States in the 1960s, especially since Federal Communications Commission (FCC) regulations require over-the-air commercial TV stations with licenses issued by the FCC—effectively all regulated TV stations, since others would either be public television or be pirated—to air political ads by both parties, whether it be attack ads or more traditional political ads. Although cable television and the Internet are not required to air such ads, attack ads have become commonplace on both media as well.

== Examples ==
=== United States ===
The first onscreen attack ads in the U.S. are usually traced back to the 1934 California gubernatorial election. Socialist author Upton Sinclair was running as the Democratic candidate against Republican Frank Merriam. It was the depths of the Great Depression, and Sinclair's End Poverty in California (EPIC) campaign platform had attracted widespread support. In response, the Hollywood film studios, led by Louis B. Mayer's MGM, raised funds to create a series of anti-Sinclair attack ads in the form of short films. Produced by Irving Thalberg, the shorts were titled "California Election News" and "were shown in almost every [movie] theater across the state." This pioneering use of negative campaigning was depicted in the 2020 Netflix film Mank, as well as in the 2022 PBS documentary, The First Attack Ads: Hollywood vs. Upton Sinclair.

"Daisy" advertisement

One of the earliest and most famous television attack ads, known as "Daisy", was used by Lyndon B. Johnson against Barry Goldwater in the 1964 presidential election. The ad opened with a young girl innocently picking petals from a daisy, while a man's voice performed a countdown to zero. It then zoomed in to an extreme close-up to her eye, and cut to an image of a nuclear explosion. The ad was shocking and disturbing, but also very effective. It convinced many that Goldwater's more aggressive approach to fighting the Cold War could result in a nuclear conflict.

During the 1968 presidential election, Vice President Hubert Humphrey made a political ad against candidate Spiro Agnew with Humphrey laughing on the TV screen showing the text "Agnew, for vice president?". The ad ended with a quote "This would be funny, if it weren't so serious..." and it also ended with Humphrey coughing due to his non-stop laughter.

Attack ads were used again by the campaign of George H. W. Bush against Democratic candidate Michael Dukakis in the 1988 presidential election. The two most famous were the "Willie Horton" and "Tank Ride" ads. The "Willie Horton" ad began with a statement of Vice President Bush's support of the death penalty. Then it described the case of Willie Horton, who was convicted of murder. The ad stated that Governor Dukakis's prison furlough program (unsupervised weekend passes from Massachusetts prison) released Horton ten times; in one of those furloughs, he kidnapped a young couple, stabbed the boy and repeatedly raped the girl. The ad ended with, "Weekend prison passes. Dukakis on crime."

The "Tank Ride" ad from 1988 was an attack on Dukakis by the GOP. It created a lasting negative impression and helped guarantee Dukakis' defeat. The ad suggested that Bush was more supportive of military spending and weapons programs than Dukakis. The footage, pulled from the news media, showed Dukakis riding a tank in his attempt to counter the claim that he was weak on defense. He wore a large, oversized helmet and a wide smile, which was used by the GOP to insinuate that he was a fool. The GOP also added gear sounds from an 18-wheeler truck to imply that Dukakis could not run the tank smoothly – although tanks do not have gears that grind.

The 2008 Democratic presidential primaries featured an ad by Hillary Clinton directed at her main rival at the time, Barack Obama, which aired days before the Texas primary. The ad began by showing children asleep in bed while a phone rang in the background. A voice-over stated that it was 3 a.m., the phone was ringing in the White House, and that "something's happening in the world". The voice-over then asked voters if they wanted someone who "already knows the world's leaders, knows the military" and is "tested and ready to lead in a dangerous world" to pick up the phone. While Obama was never mentioned by name, the implication was clear and the ad set off a firestorm of discussion and controversy, causing even Obama himself to respond and describe it as an ad that "play[ed] on people's fears", predicting it would not work. Later in the campaign, after Obama had become the Democratic nominee, Republican nominee John McCain echoed a similar sentiment. In a controversial ad called "Celebrity", McCain's campaign asked, "[Barack Obama] is the biggest celebrity in the world. But, is he ready to lead?" The ad juxtaposed Obama supporters with photos of Britney Spears and Paris Hilton.

By 2010, attack ads had spread online as political candidates published their ads on YouTube. Carly Fiorina, a Republican candidate from California, released a video on YouTube depicting former Republican opponent Tom Campbell as a "Fiscal conservative in name only".

=== Mexico ===
The first attack ads of the 2006 Mexican general election were launched by the conservative National Action Party against Andrés Manuel López Obrador; the ad claimed that López Obrador's "populistic" proposals would drive Mexico further into economic crisis and bankruptcy. The Party of the Democratic Revolution answered with attack ads against the current president Felipe Calderón, claiming that he was partly culpable for the 1994 economic crisis; since Calderón was running with a motto of "the president of employment", the ads closed with, "dirty hands, zero employments". After López Obrador alleged that Calderón was illegally patronizing his brother-in-law Hildebrando Zavala, the tagline was changed to "dirty hands, one employment for his brother-in-law".

=== Canada ===
Although it has been found that Canadian elections are less likely to use attack ads than US elections, there has been an increasingly strong presence of negative ads in Canadian campaigns in modern times. Comparatively, Canadians were more likely to use acclaim ads- or ads that praise another individual- than Americans, as American campaigns are much more likely to use attack ads than Canadian campaigns. Overall, however, Canadian campaigns are more likely to use attack ads than acclaim ads, similarly to the US. Famous examples of Canadian attack ads include the 1993 Chrétien attack ad during the 1993 Canadian federal election, and the 2006 Liberal Party of Canada election ads during the 2006 Canadian federal election, both of which were widely criticized and ultimately managed to improve the electoral results of the candidates being targeted by the ads.

=== Philippines ===
During the 2016 general election campaign, presidential candidate and Senator Antonio Trillanes launched negative advertisements that featured six children against presidential candidate and Davao City Mayor Rodrigo Duterte on ABS-CBN a few days before the election on May 9, 2016.

The 30-second advertisement showing each of the six children (four boys and two girls) briefly criticizes the video clips shown: Duterte's remarks of "killing everybody", his cursing on Pope Francis, yelling "Mabuhay ang NPA" (lit. 'Long live the NPA!'), kissing a woman and his comments about the rape-slay on the Australian missionary, the remarks of his war on drug campaign "would be bloody" should Duterte elected president, and finally raising his blurred middle finger.

The advertisement drew criticism from Duterte's supporters on social media. A 72-hour temporary restraining order was issued by Taguig Regional Trial Court to stop ABS-CBN and its TV stations from airing the negative advertisement. Duterte's running mate, vice-presidential candidate Alan Peter Cayetano, accused President Benigno Aquino III; two other rivals, Mar Roxas and Grace Poe; and ABS-CBN of conspiracy for making the ad. Former PCOO Secretary Sonny Coloma denied the conspiracy claim made by Cayetano. Prior to the airing of the ad, the ABS-CBN Corporation issued a statement that the ad had been reviewed to the ethics committee, complied with election laws, and was allowed to air. Later, TV5 refused to air the controversial ad, the TV5 Network stating that the ad had not met requirements.

On February 24, 2020, during the Senate hearing on the ABS-CBN franchise renewal, GMA Network, Inc. First Vice President for Legal Affairs, Maria Luz Delfin clarified that the GMA Network had not aired the ad, stating that it was disapproved by the internal election committee.

=== Non-political usage ===
While attack ads have primarily been relegated for political usage, there have been some instances of private businesses running them. In 2013, Highmark, a healthcare company associated with the Blue Cross Blue Shield Association, and the University of Pittsburgh Medical Center (UPMC) were unable to reach an agreement on whether Highmark's insurance would be accepted at UPMC. Highmark also entered into negotiations to acquire the struggling West Penn Allegheny Health System; Highmark and UPMC then started airing attack ads at each other. Both parties' ads accused the other of pushing patients with their respective health insurance plans to hospitals operated by their respective health insurance provider, as well as attacking each other's nonprofit status. At the same year, T-Mobile, AT&T, Sprint and Verizon began airing attack ads against each other.

== Effect on voter turnout ==
Studies suggest that attack ads have no effect on voter turnout in the United States. There is, in fact, a noted negative impact on voter turnout by some researches, but it has no bearing on the evidence as it is statistically insignificant. The only case in which evidence reveals a correlation between negative advertising and voter turnout is for "late" negativity. This is when two conditions exist for the voter: they have already selected their preferred candidate and the attack and the negativity is about their selected candidate. If these two conditions exist, there is a negative effect on voter turnout. In this case, a forty percent increase in "late" negative ads will decrease the likelihood of turnout by 0.087, and a sixty percent increase in late ads merits a 0.145 decrease in turnout. Thus, the only case in which attack ads have been found to effect on voter turn out is when the voter has already selected their candidate, as they realize that their candidate is potentially no better than the alternative options.

== Effectiveness ==
Studies claim that 82% of Americans dislike attack ads, and 53% believe that the "ethics and values" of election campaigns have worsened since 1985. The voting public see attack ads as an element of smear campaigning. Other research indicates that voters are open to candidates attacking each other if the issues in question are "appropriate". In a 1999 survey of Virginia voters, 80.7% felt it is fair for a candidate to criticize an opponent for "talking one way and voting another", though but only 7.7% feel it is fair for a candidate to attack an opponent for the "behavior of his/her family members".

Political operatives, however, have found attack ads to be useful, and social psychologists claim that negative information has a tendency "to be more influential than equally extreme or equally likely positive information". University of Toronto professor Scott Hawkins "suggests that even a mention in the media that a candidate or party is planning to run negative advertisements can be beneficial, since it plants seeds of doubt in the voter's mind, especially early in the campaign when voters tend to be less involved. If the reported claims turn up in advertisements later in the campaign, they already seem familiar to the voter."

In the United States, researchers have consistently found that negative advertising has positive effects. Negative advertising "is likely to stimulate voters by increasing the degree to which they care about the election's outcome or by increasing ties to their party's nominee;" it makes the election seem more important, and thus increases voter turnout. Other research has found that negative advertisements only appeal to partisan voters, and that it alienates independents, causing elections to be fought among partisan extremes.

=== Backfires ===
If an ad is seen as going too far or being "too personal", voters may turn against the party that put the ad out. For example, in the Canada 1993 federal election, the Progressive Conservative (PC) Party attacked Liberal Party leader Jean Chrétien by implicitly mocking his partial facial paralysis, which was caused by Bell's palsy. Outrage followed, and the PC Party's image was badly damaged in the polls. Similar backlash happened to the Liberal Party of Canada in the 2006 federal election, when they created an attack ad suggesting that Conservative leader Stephen Harper would use armed Canadian soldiers to police major cities. Though the ads were never aired, they diminished the believability of other ads by the Liberal Party. A leaked copy, broadcast on the news, offended many Canadians, particularly the military, some of whom were fighting in Afghanistan at the time.

In the run up to, and in the 2015 Canadian federal election itself, Justin Trudeau, Leader of the Liberal Party of Canada and the son of Canadian Prime Minister, Pierre Trudeau, was subjected to a sustained negative ad campaign by the Conservative Party of Canada. However, the "Just Not Ready" campaign was judged by the public as unfair and mocking of the Liberal leader. More importantly, the advertising campaign lowered public expectations of Trudeau's performance that even Conservative personnel noted that he would impress people if he showed any display of competence in public events such as the televised debates. That proved to be the case, and Trudeau took advantage of the public's low expectations to impress the public with his articulate and passionate manner to garner support throughout the campaign until his party won a majority government.

In 2006, Republican challenger Paul R. Nelson campaigned against Democrat Ron Kind for a seat in the United States House of Representatives. Nelson's ad stated, "Ron Kind has no trouble spending your money, he'd just rather spend it on sex," and, "Instead of spending money on cancer research, Ron Kind voted to spend your money to study the sex lives of Vietnamese prostitutes." Nelson's challenge fell short, as Ron Kind was reelected, while the attack's outrageous presentation provoked an uproar from Republicans and Democrats alike. A 1999 survey showed that challengers lose almost 3 points on the feeling thermometer (a 100-point scale used to assess survey-takers feelings on certain issues) when a candidate engages in mudslinging. The study also shows that the influence of negativity is less powerful for challengers than for incumbents.

== Front groups ==
Campaigns often establish or support front groups (organizations that appear to be independent voluntary associations or charity) to run counter-attack ads. This technique ties into the wider practice of astroturfing. Former political speechwriter Leonard Steinhorn points out that "issue ads" run by front groups use deceptive names to hide their true sponsors – such as the pharmaceutical industry-backed United Seniors Association, which spent $17 million on ads during the 2000 US presidential election. As front ads are not controlled by the candidates they support, the candidates are insulated from criticism.

== Popular culture ==
George Orwell's dystopian novel Nineteen Eighty-Four includes mention of the "Two Minutes Hate", a routine in which workers are subject to films encouraging distrust, fear and hatred towards the enemies of Big Brother.

== See also ==
- Ad hominem
