= Martin Wattenberg =

Martin Wattenberg is the name of:

- Martin Wattenberg (political scientist), professor at the University of California, Irvine
- Martin M. Wattenberg (born 1970), computer scientist and artist
