= Allan Gregg =

Canadian pollster

Allan Gregg is a Canadian pollster, political advisor, television interviewer and pundit.

== Early life ==
Gregg was born in Edmonton, Alberta. He was the eldest child in his family, which consisted of four boys and one girl. Gregg graduated from Harry Ainlay High School. Gregg then went on to study political science at the University of Alberta and Carleton University in Ottawa. He briefly served as a lecturer while working on his PhD.

== Tory strategist ==
Gregg has long been involved in Canadian politics. He first came to national attention as the national campaign secretary of the Progressive Conservative Party of Canada successful effort in the 1979 federal election.

Soon after that campaign, Gregg founded Decima Research, a joint polling/public relations firm. The company became the Conservative party's polling firm, and Gregg played an important role in the 1984 election when the PC Party was led by Brian Mulroney.

Gregg was an unusual-looking figure in Canadian politics, and especially in the Tory party. He founded a record label, The Song Corp., and was co-manager of the Tragically Hip. He also served a five-year stint as Chair of the Toronto International Film Festival.

He rose to greater prominence in the 1988 election where he handled communications and polling for the PC Party. He directed the famed bridge bombing attack on Liberal leader John Turner that was designed to break the bridge linking anti-free trade voters to Turner. The offensive was a success, Turner's popularity dropped, and the Tories were re-elected. He also played an important role in the 1992 Canadian referendum where he crafted the message that the doom of Canada would be the certain result of a "No" vote.

== 1993 election ==
Gregg was given even more responsibility in the 1993 federal election campaign. He was senior pollster as well as top strategist and communications manager.

The 1993 Conservative Federal campaign was an unmitigated disaster for all concerned, including Gregg. Gregg again pushed for negative tactics, crafting an attack ad one of which Canadians found especially distasteful and offensive. The ad appeared to ridicule a facial deformity of Liberal leader Jean Chrétien. This ad backfired and the Conservatives were reduced to two seats in the House of Commons of Canada from their previous 151 seats. This was the result of a number of factors, including the intense unpopularity of former Conservative Prime Minister Brian Mulroney. His party suffered the worst defeat ever in Canadian history for an incumbent federal party.

While the Tory campaign was not going well, this television ad (which aired on only one evening) was a memorable element. Modern Canadian national political campaign coverage has had few noteworthy campaign moments, but much like the 1984 Mulroney Turner debate ("You had an option, sir"), this advertising mistake was memorable. Attacking a physical defect was widely seen by Canadians as a low blow and as an American-style no-holds-barred campaign style that should not be imported. Several years later Gregg wrote about this in the pages of Saturday Night magazine, where he argued that "the ad tested well in the focus groups."

== Pollster ==
After the campaign, Gregg left public life for a time. He quit Decima, and sold his share of the company.

After a year off, he founded a new company, The Strategic Counsel, a market research and consulting firm, but one geared towards business rather than politics. He returned to the public eye as a columnist in Maclean's magazine and a frequent pundit on the Canadian Broadcasting Corporation news for several years.

Gregg also had a weekly television show, Allan Gregg in Conversation with... on the public broadcaster TVOntario. Its format was a half-hour, in-depth interview format, in which the subject of the interview was usually an author or intellectual discussing a current release. After several years of production TVO cancelled the program.

In 2001, he strongly denounced negative campaigning in a lecture at the School of Journalism and Communication at Carleton University, saying that it would destroy politics as we know it and "invite totally unaccountable forces" to "influence society without the countervailing force of representative democracy".

== Personal life ==
Gregg was born in 1952 and has three children; his wife Marjorie died in 1995.
