= 2006 Liberal Party of Canada election ads =

In the 2006 federal election in Canada, the Liberal Party of Canada used attack ads against Conservative Party of Canada leader Stephen Harper. The Liberals, trailing in polls during the last weeks of the campaign, resorted to strong and often questionable negative ads directed towards the Conservative party, by attempting to depict Harper as an extreme right-wing politician. The advertisements were generally seen as excessive, and failed to prevent a Conservative victory.

== The ads ==
These 30 second attack ads were produced and aired by the Liberal Party. All featured a close-up picture of Stephen Harper with the sound of war drums beating. The ads focused on some comments from Harper's past and the Conservative platform. Most of these assertions were derided by the Canadian public and media. Several articles, including one by Paul Wells of Maclean's magazine, indicated that the Liberals were grasping at straws, and that not all of the comments could be proven.

- "Like Stephen Harper, Mike Harris had a right wing agenda. Remember the Common Sense Revolution? Remember the environmental neglect, the shattered social programs, the crumbling schools and hospitals, the huge deficits? Yeah, that Common Sense Revolution. Do we really want to go down that road again?"
- "Who paid for Stephen Harper's rise to the head of the party? We don't know. He refuses to reveal his donors. What do you suppose he's hiding? We do know he's very popular with right wingers in the U.S. They have money, maybe they helped him. We just don't know. He just won't say."
- "Gilles Duceppe and Stephen Harper worked together to bring down the government. Lots of late-night secret meetings. Apparently, they're quite a team. Which is great. Because if Harper wins this election? He'll have to work very, very closely with Duceppe. Unfortunately, their unity won't do much for Canada's unity."
- "This is what Stephen Harper told his American friends: 'Canada is content to become a second-tier socialist country, boasting ever more loudly about its economy and social services, to mask its second-rate status.' When he said, 'You won't recognize Canada when I get through with it,' he wasn't kidding."
- "Stephen Harper spoke to a secret, ultra right-wing American think tank. In a Montreal hotel, off limits to press and public, he said, 'America, and particularly your conservative movement, is a light and an inspiration to people in this country and across the world.' No. We did not make that up. We're not allowed to make stuff up."
- "Stephen Harper's stand on public health care? '... Provinces have allowed private health care services in the past. Why should I care? Why should the Federal government care how they're managed?' Seriously, that's what he said. Well, Paul Martin cares very much, Mr. Harper. And so do Canadians."
- "Here's what Stephen Harper told some of his American pals about Canada's unemployed: 'Don't feel particularly bad for these people. They don't feel bad about it themselves. Not as long as they're receiving generous social assistance and unemployment insurance.' Not exactly the kind of compassion we're looking for in a Prime Minister, is it? A social safety net is a fundamental Canadian value, Mr. Harper."
- "Stephen Harper's view of Atlantic Canada? 'Unfortunately, many people in Atlantic Canada feel that it's only through government favours that there will be economic progress.'He called us 'A culture of defeat.'And he said: 'Atlantic Canada needs Quebec to stay in Canada because of our weak economy.' Maybe we should choose someone who actually loves Atlantic Canada." (This ad was often played after one of the previous ads in the Atlantic region).
- "From the Washington Times, Dec. 2, 2005: 'Canada may elect the most pro-American leader in the Western world. Harper is pro-Iraq war, anti-Kyoto and socially conservative. Bush's new best friend is the poster boy for his ideal foreign leader. A Harper victory will put a smile on George W. Bush's face.' Well, at least someone will be happy, eh?"
- "Stephen Harper has made a lot of promises to a lot of people. Apparently, he's made a few too many. Now he admits he'll have to either raise taxes, or run a deficit to pay for them all. Wow. He's not even elected yet. And he's already running a deficit."
- "Get a load of this. Stephen Harper once said: 'The Western ridings that the Liberals hold are dominated by either recent Asian immigrants or recent migrants from eastern Canada. People who live in ghettos.' We're not kidding. He actually said that."

The ads ended with a voice stating the Liberal campaign slogan, "Choose Your Canada".

=== "Soldiers" ad ===
By far the most controversial ad was the following: "Stephen Harper actually announced he wants to increase military presence in our cities. Canadian cities. Soldiers with guns. In our cities. In Canada. We did not make this up."

This ad was never aired on television. It appeared on the Liberal Party of Canada's website, before being widely replayed on the news media. This drew widespread criticism from commentators that the Liberals were scaremongering, and seemingly suggesting that the Conservatives wanted to use the military against Canadian civilians. The ad was then pulled from the website.

== Parodies ==
Due to the melodramatic nature of the ads, they became ripe for Internet parody and found their way into the satire of popular culture. Some were later reprinted in The Globe and Mail and National Post newspapers. The comedy show This Hour Has 22 Minutes and Royal Canadian Air Farce also created a series of parodies of the attack ads. Outside Canada, the American late-night talk show The Daily Show ran its own parody of the ads, with anti-Canadian rhetoric.

Examples of parodies that were printed in the National Post included:

- "Stephen Harper has a dog. You know who else had a dog? Hitler. Adolf Hitler. That's who. Did Stephen Harper train his dog to attack racial minorities on command? We don't know. He's not saying."
- "Stephen Harper likes to wear black. You know who else wears black? Darth Vader. Do you really want Darth Vader running your country?"
- "In 1963, In Dallas, Democratic president John F. Kennedy was shot and killed. Where was four year old Stephen Harper? We don't know. He's not saying. We didn't make this up."
- "Stephen Harper wants to put a giant laser on the moon. He will use it to burn his initials into Greenland. We're not making this up, We're not allowed to make stuff up."

== See also ==
- 1993 Chrétien attack ad
- Attack ad
- Negative campaigning
