= Synkinesis =

Involuntary muscle contraction in response to another muscle moving

- Specialty: Neurology

Synkinesis is a neurological symptom in which a voluntary muscle movement causes the simultaneous involuntary contraction of other muscles. An example might be smiling inducing an involuntary contraction of the eye muscles, causing a person to squint when smiling. Facial and extraocular muscles are affected most often; in rare cases, a person's hands might perform mirror movements.

Synkinesis is usually caused by dysfunction of a particular nerve. Potential causes include improper healing after nerve trauma or neurodegeneration, as occurs in Parkinson's disease. In congenital cases, mutations of genes involved in nerve growth, specifically axonal growth have been found. Rarely, it occurs as part of syndromes with neuroendocrine problems, such as Kallman syndrome. The prognosis is usually good with normal intelligence and lifespan. Treatment depends on the cause, but is largely conservative with facial retraining or mime therapy, if needed, while Botox and surgery are used as last resort.

== Types ==
Most cases involve the cranial nerves, which innervate many small cranial muscles, such as the facial muscles and the extraocular muscles. This is in contrast to areas of body where miswiring of the larger muscles is less evident due to the size of the muscles. Synkinesis can also involve the upper limbs, especially hands which is quite rare, at 1 case in 1 million. In some cases, nerves improperly regenerate into glands, such as lacrimal glands, leading to a condition known as crocodile tears or Bogorad's syndrome.

=== Facial synkinesis ===
Facial synkinesis is a common sequela to Idiopathic Facial Nerve Paralysis, also called Bell's Palsy or Facial Palsy. Bell's Palsy, which is thought to occur due to a viral reactivation which can lead (through unknown mechanisms) to diffuse axon demyelination and degeneration of the seventh cranial nerve, results in a hemifacial paralysis due to non-functionality of the nerve. As the nerve attempts to recover, nerve miswiring results (see Mechanism of Action below). In patients with severe facial nerve paralysis, facial synkinesis frequently develops. Additionally, a common treatment option for facial palsy is to use electrical stimulation. Unfortunately, this has been shown to be disruptive to normal re-innervation and can promote the development of synkinesis. The most common symptoms of facial synkinesis include:

- Eye closure with volitional contraction of mouth muscles
- Midfacial movements with volitional eye closure
- Neck tightness (Platysmal contraction) with volitional smiling
- Hyperlacrimation (also called Crocodile Tears)
  - A case where eating provokes excessive lacrimation. This has been attributed to neural interaction between the salivary glands and the lacrimal glands.

=== Extra-ocular muscle synkinesis ===
The six muscles around the eye (extraocular muscles) are innervated by three different cranial nerves: Abducens (6th nerve), Trochlear (4th nerve), and Oculomotor (3rd nerve). After nerve trauma around the eye, a combination of any two of these three cranial nerves have been shown to be involved with extra-ocular synkinesis. Moreover, while the abducens and the trochlear nerve each innervate one specific muscle, the oculomotor nerve has many functions including eyelid retraction and pupil constriction. Thus, during synkinesis, one of these functions may be involved. Examples include:

- On attempted abduction of an affected eye, the eye adducts and the eyelid retracts.
  - This is an interaction between the abducens nerve and a branch of the oculomotor nerve. Voluntary activation of the abducens nerve (eye abduction) causes involuntary activation of the oculomotor nerve (eye adduction and eyelid elevation).
- On attempted abduction, the eye's unreactive pupil constricts
  - Another interaction, yet different, is between eye abduction (abducens nerve) and pupil constriction (the oculomotor nerve).
- On attempted adduction with eye depression, the eyelid retracts.
  - In this case voluntary activation of the trochlear nerve (eye depression + eye abduction) is involuntarily activating a branch of the oculomotor nerve responsible for eyelid retraction.
- Focusing to the near (accommodation) is accompanied by involuntary convergence of the eyes. This accommodation-convergence synkinesis can result in esotropia, or eyes that turn in when the ratio between accommodation and convergence is unusually high.

Other less common variations of synkinesis involving the cranial nerves include:

- Trigeminal-Abducens Synkinesis
  - After physical trauma to the skull, the muscle involved in eye abduction can become reinnervated by the branch of the trigeminal nerve involved in innervating the muscles of mastication(chewing muscles). Thus, involuntary abduction of an involved eye will occur upon eating or chewing.
- Trigeminal-Facial Synkinesis
  - After surgical trauma, the muscles of mastication can become reinnervated by the facial nerve as opposed to the trigeminal nerve. This causes weakness in voluntary chewing; also, facial movements such as blinking cause the muscles to contract.

=== Bimanual Synkinesis ===
Bimanual Synkinesis occurs when left and right upper limbs, especially the hands and fingers execute exactly the same movement even though only one hand is intentionally moved. It is also called "mirror hand movements" and persists throughout life. When it occurs by itself without other associated signs and symptoms it is associated with normal intelligence and lifespan. It can also develop in the course of Parkinson's disease. In association with other abnormalities, mirror hand movements are a hallmark of Kallmann syndrome.

Genetic mutations associated with (congenital) mirror hand movements are in the DCC (gene) or RAD51 gene, which account for about 35 percent of cases. In DCC mutation, impaired or missing netrin 1 receptor protein impairs control of axon growth during nervous system development.

== Causes ==
Almost all cases of synkinesis develop as a sequel to nerve trauma. (The exception is when it is congenitally acquired as in Duane-Retraction Syndrome and Marcus Gunn phenomenon.) Trauma to the nerve can be induced in cases such as surgical procedures, nerve inflammation, neuroma, and physical injury.

== Mechanism ==
There are three proposed mechanisms for synkinesis: aberrant nerve regeneration, interneuronal ephaptic transmission, and nuclear hyperexcitability.

=== Aberrant nerve regeneration ===
The aberrant nerve regeneration hypothesis is the most widely accepted mechanism for synkinesis. The hypothesis states that, after trauma, axons project from the facial nucleus to incorrect peripheral muscle groups. These aberrant branches can simultaneously innervate different subdivisions of the facial nerve.

For example: compression to the facial nerve causes a lesion and the set of axons that innervates the orbicularis oris (mouth muscle) degenerate. Once the compression has relieved, regeneration of axons from the lesion site begins. This time though, only 50% of the set of axons that innervate the orbicularis oris successfully reinnervate the original site. The other half aberrantly branched off and innervated the orbicularis oculi (eye muscle). Thus, when the patient purses their lips, the ipsilateral eye will squint.

The hypothesis assumes that disorganized regeneration occurs at the site of the lesion. On the contrary, recent research by Choi and Raisman has provided a more thorough understanding of synkinesis through aberrant axonal regeneration. Their study has shown that regenerating axons become disorganized throughout the length of the nerve and not only at the site of the lesion. Previously, many developed treatment strategies (that inevitably failed) were invented based on the original hypothesis by only focusing on the lesion site for improving the organization of regeneration. The new modification to the hypothesis could allow for better success in developing treatments.

=== Ephaptic transmission ===
Ephaptic transmission is when two nerves communicate with each other via an artificial synapse between nerves. Healthy peripheral nerves are insulated with a myelin sheath that helps to both enhance electric transmission and to prevent cross-talk between parallel nerves. After a lesion, it has been observed that regenerating nerves might not be myelinated effectively. Consequently, the two nerve fibers can come into contact and provide a means for an impulse to be directly conducted through the nerve membrane. An analogy for this is having two uninsulated electrical wires placed adjacent to each other. Thus, the two nerves are able to “cross-talk” and send action potentials in both directions.

=== Nuclear hyperexcitability ===
The basis of this hypothesis is as follows: after a lesion, axonal degeneration (via Wallerian degeneration) occurs. The post-synaptic cell consequently becomes deprived of input and becomes more sensitive to neurotransmitters (e.g. creating additional receptors). Subsequently, nearby residual undamaged axons can provide a source of neurotransmitter to the deprived post-synaptic cell. Since the post-synaptic cell is hypersensitive, the neurotransmitters that reach it from an axon of another nerve will successfully provide stimulation. This consequently creates undesired peripheral movement (i.e. synkinesis).

- Since synkinesis has been reported in patients within 1–2 months, the nuclear hyper-excitability hypothesis is being supported by more researchers. Furthermore, axonal regeneration is a slow process (~1 mm/day growth) and regeneration at this rate of the facial nerve would roughly take 4–8 months. Since synkinesis is observed much earlier, aberrant regeneration and ephaptic communication fail to explain for this observation thus providing evidence that nuclear hyper-excitability is an important factor in the mechanism of synkinesis development.

Although these three mechanisms have been argued for and against in various ways, it has become more accepted that synkinesis develops through a combination of these mechanisms.

== Diagnosis ==
=== Measurement ===
Until May 2007, there was no clinical scale to measure synkinesis. A study led by Mehta et al. has validated the use of a newly designed instrument to evaluate facial synkinesis called the Synkinesis Assessment Questionnaire (SAQ). The instrument, consisting of nine questions, was found to be both reliable and valid. In addition, it is simple, easy to administer, and inexpensive. Its analyses can allow for treatment options to be evaluated.

== Treatment ==
Experimental research for treatment has been mostly focused on facial synkinesis due to its abundant prevalence compared to extra-ocular synkinesis. Additionally, since the extra-ocular muscles are hidden within the orbits, there is a limit on the type of practical treatments that can be established (e.g. massage). Treatments for synkinesis in general include facial retraining, biofeedback, mime therapy, and Botox and surgery, as a last resort.

=== Facial retraining ===
Facial retraining therapy builds upon the idea that neurons are constantly in a dynamic state. In other words, there is constant growth and regression of neuronal projections dependent on the stimuli produced. To reduce synkinesis, facial retraining teaches the patient techniques for increasing wanted movements while focusing on restricting unwanted movement. If, for example, the mouth moves whenever the eyes blink voluntarily, facial retraining techniques will teach the patient to slowly close the eyes while actively focusing on keeping the mouth muscles still. Facial retraining has shown to be very successful with almost a 60-70% average decrease in synkinesis reported after 7 months.

=== Biofeedback ===
Biofeedback therapy for facial synkinesis aims to increase the patient's awareness of the facial muscle posture and movement. Facial muscles contain few to none intrinsic muscle sensory receptors (used for proprioceptive feedback) and additionally they do not span movable joints and so lack joint receptors (another source for proprioceptive feedback). Thus, biofeedback allows the patient to actively sense the motion of their muscles. The two common forms of biofeedback used are electromyographic feedback and mirror feedback. Electromyographic feedback includes visual EMG signals (coming from facial muscle sites displayed to the patient from a computer in the form of waveform traces) or auditory signals that indicate strength of muscle contraction. The subsequent role of the patient is to control the movement of undesired muscle during volitional movement by incorporating the information perceived through the EMG. While mirror feedback is a much more basic way of providing the patient feedback on muscle movement, studies have shown that both are very effective options for synkinesis/paresis reduction. Biofeedback is commonly coupled to facial retraining techniques to achieve maximal effectiveness.
A study by Nakamura et al. has shown that biofeedback works better for prevention of synkinesis as opposed to treatment of synkinesis. Due to the extreme efforts needed to achieve improvements during synkinesis, Nakamura et al. observed that patients will often fail to reach their desired goal because of the difficulty of maintaining motivation during training. The desired course of action is to catch the patient shortly after facial nerve trauma and teach the patient biofeedback techniques. This course of action has been experimentally proven to significantly reduce the development of synkinesis.

=== Mime therapy ===
Mime therapy was introduced in the Netherlands in 1980. It was initially designed to treat facial palsy by improving symmetry of the face both at rest and during movement. It was then later observed that people who had post-facial palsy synkinesis also benefited from this therapy. It wasn't until 2003 that Beurskens and Heymans were able to experimentally conclude that mime therapy was indeed a good treatment choice for synkinesis. Furthermore, later studies by Beurskens et al. have shown that benefits obtained from mime therapy are stable one year after therapy. Current mime therapy consists of a combination of procedures designed to promote symmetry of the face at rest and during movement to control synkinesis. The components include: massage, stretching exercises, exercises to coordinate both halves of the face, etc. The overall aim of mime therapy is to develop a conscious connection between the use of facial muscles and emotional expression. While facial retraining therapy is more focused on treating slight synkinetic movements, mime therapy aims to increase the overall vigor of the muscles through active exercises, while in the process of doing so, teaching the face to decrease unwanted synkinetic movements.

=== Botox ===
Botox (botulinum toxin) is a new and versatile tool for the treatment of synkinesis. Initially used for reducing hyperkinesis after facial palsy, Botox was later attempted on patients with post-facial palsy synkinesis to reduce unwanted movements. The effects of Botox have shown to be remarkable, with synkinetic symptoms disappearing within 2 or 3 days. The most common treatment targets are the orbicularis oculi, depressor anguli oris (DAO), mentalis, platysma and the contralateral depressor labii inferioris muscles. Due to the short span of Botox effects though, patients must come back to the doctor for re-injection approximately every 3 months. More notable is that in a majority of patients, various synkinetic movements completely disappeared after 2-3 sessions of trimonthly Botox injections. A more specific synkinesis, crocodile tears syndrome (hyperlacrimation upon eating), has been shown to respond exceedingly well to Botox injection. Botox is injected directly into the lacrimal gland and has shown to reduce hyperlacrimation within 24–48 hours. The procedure was shown to be simple and safe with very little chance of side-effects (although on rare occasions ptosis can occur due to botulinum toxin diffusion). Furthermore, reduction in hyper-lacrimation was shown to last longer than the expected 3 months (about 12 months). Since Botox can mimic facial paralysis, an optimized dose has been determined that reduces involuntary synkinesis of the muscle while not affecting muscle tone.

=== Surgery ===
Practical surgical procedures used for treating synkinesis are neurolysis and selective myectomy. Neurolysis has been shown to be effective in relieving synkinesis but only temporarily and unfortunately symptoms return much worse than originally. Selective myectomy, in which a synkinetic muscle is selectively resected, is a much more effective technique that can provide permanent relief and results in a low recurrence rate; post-operative complications may include edema, hematoma, and ecchymosis.

== See also ==
- Paralysis
- Paresis
