= Marcus Gunn phenomenon =

Presence of eyelid spasms while moving the jaw muscles

- Other names: Marcus Gunn jaw-winking or Trigemino-oculomotor synkinesis
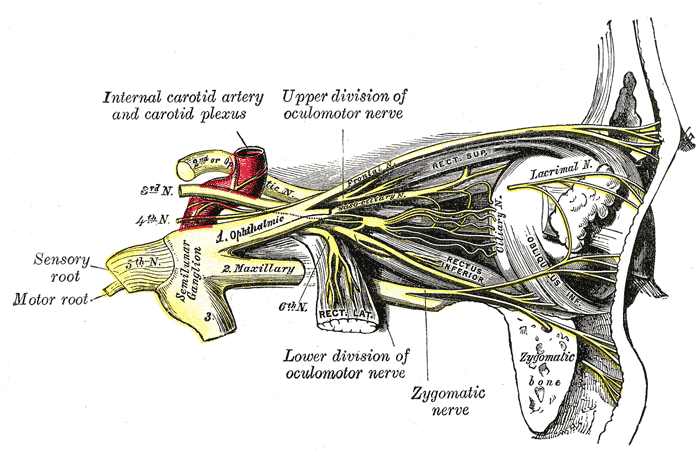
- Nerves of the orbit, and the ciliary ganglion. Side view. (Trigeminal nerve and oculomotor nerve both visible)
- Specialty: Ophthalmology neurology

Marcus Gunn phenomenon is an autosomal dominant condition with incomplete penetrance, in which nursing infants will have rhythmic upward jerking of their upper eyelid. This condition is characterized as a synkinesis: when two or more muscles that are independently innervated have either simultaneous or coordinated movements.

Common physiologic examples of synkineses occur during sucking, chewing, or conjugate eye movements. There are also several abnormal cranial nerve synkineses, both acquired and congenital. Marcus Gunn jaw-winking is an example of a pathologic congenital synkinesis.

First described by the ophthalmologist Marcus Gunn in 1883, this condition presents in approximately 5% of neonates with congenital ptosis. This condition has been associated with amblyopia (in 54% of cases), anisometropia (26%), and strabismus (56%).

== Presentation ==
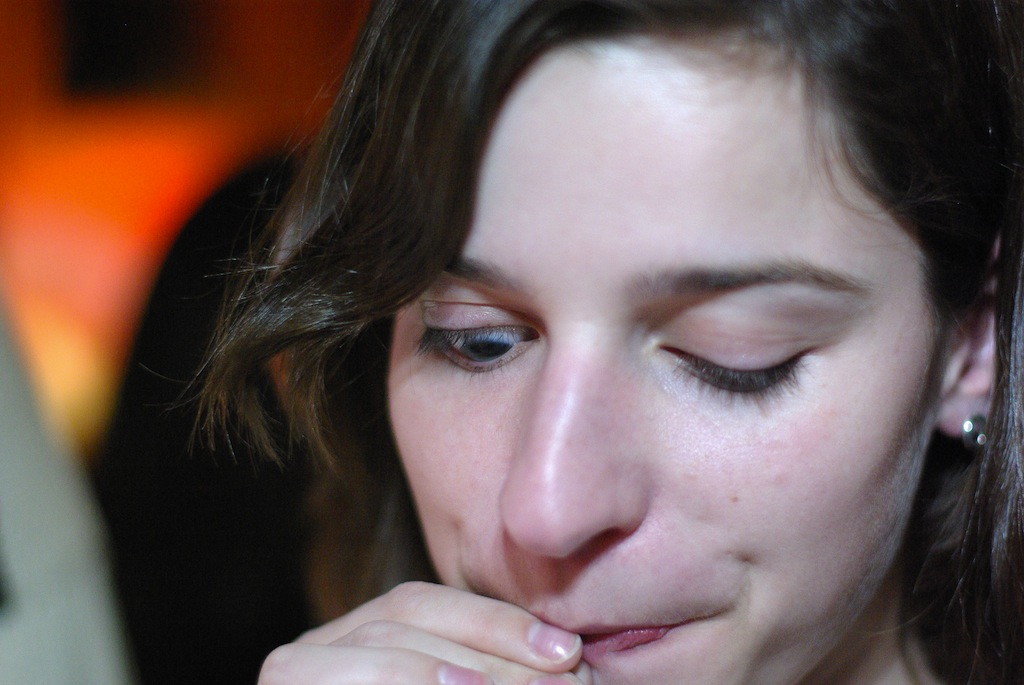
An affected young woman demonstrating the Marcus Gunn Jaw Wink Phenomenon. The woman cannot control her eyelids while sucking on a straw. This is a particularly mild case.

=== Behavioral and social implications ===
Although treatment may be unnecessary, there may be social implications, especially in young children when venturing from a supportive home environment to a public environment (e.g., starting school). Continued support, including monitoring behavior and educating the child about his or her appearance as seen by others, is encouraged. Gradual or sudden withdrawal from interaction with others is a sign that may or may not be related to such behavior. Studies are being conducted to elucidate these implications.

== Pathophysiology ==
It has been postulated that the synkinesis is due to damage to cranial nerve nuclei, caused by peripheral nerve injury and the nuclear lesion releases evolutionarily older [neural] mechanisms with their tendency toward associated movements, and so primitive reflexes are not inhibited.

Marcus Gunn jaw-winking is an exaggeration of a very weak physiologic co-contraction that has been disinhibited secondary to a congenital brain stem lesion. The stimulation of the trigeminal nerve by contraction of the pterygoid muscles of jaw results in the excitation of the branch of the oculomotor nerve that innervates the levator palpebrae superioris ipsilaterally (on the same side of the face), so the patient will have rhythmic upward jerking of their upper eyelid.

There are two major groups of trigemino-oculomotor synkineses:
1) External pterygoid-levator synkinesis is when the eyelid raises upon:

- Jaw thrust to opposite side (homolateral external pterygoid)
- Jaw is projected forward (bilateral external pterygoid)
- Mouth is opened widely

2) Internal pterygoid-levator synkinesis is when the eyelid raises upon teeth clenching

External pterygoid-levator synkinesis is the more common group.

== Treatment ==
Treatment is usually unnecessary. In severe cases, surgery with a bilateral levator excision and frontalis brow suspension may be used.

== Inverse Marcus Gunn phenomenon ==
Inverse Marcus Gunn phenomenon is a rare condition that causes the eyelid to fall upon opening of the mouth. In this case, trigeminal innervation to the pterygoid muscles of the jaw is associated with an inhibition of the branch of the oculomotor nerve to the levator palpebrae superioris, as opposed to stimulation in Marcus Gunn jaw-winking.
