= Chrétien attack ad =

1993 Canadian campaign ad

"Is this a Prime Minister?"

During the 1993 Canadian federal election campaign, the Progressive Conservative (PC) Party produced a televised attack ad against Jean Chrétien, the Liberal Party leader. The ad (sometimes referred to as the "face ad") was perceived by many as a focus on Chrétien's facial deformity, caused by Bell's palsy. The resulting outcry is considered to be an example of voter backlash from negative campaigning.

== Background ==
Heading into the 1993 election, the Progressive Conservatives were beset by many problems, notably the ongoing recession, the unpopular Goods and Services Tax, and loss of support to the recently formed Reform Party and Bloc Québécois. While the party was initially optimistic about being able to at least retain second place, its support had dropped badly in the final weeks of the campaign. Realizing that without something dramatic the Liberals were certain to win a majority government, the PC campaign leaders decided to launch a group of four ads attacking Chrétien and his record.

PC campaign director (and future Toronto mayor) John Tory was mainly responsible for deciding to launch the ads, along with Allan Gregg, a pollster who was one of the top campaign managers. Gregg had launched a series of attack ads aimed at Liberal leader John Turner in the last days of the 1988 election to great effect. The new ads were produced quickly, and few in the party, including Prime Minister and PC leader Kim Campbell, who was on the campaign trail, saw them before they were aired.

== The second ad and immediate reaction ==
The second of the four ads premiered on October 14, 1993. The ad featured still pictures of Chrétien's face interspersed with comments by actors posing as regular Canadians; the first voiceover asked "Is this a Prime Minister?" with other voices questioning his record. The final, and most prominent, line was "I would be very embarrassed if he became Prime Minister of Canada."

While the ad's creators claimed they had meant for the voiceover lines to refer to Chrétien's policies and ethics, the intercutting of the lines with images of the Liberal leader's face, focusing on his facial deformity, were interpreted by many as an attack on Chrétien's appearance and health condition. The Liberal Party encouraged its members to call media outlets about the ad, an effort championed by Roméo LeBlanc.

== Reaction and backlash ==
External videos
- A 1993 CBC news segment on the ad in question and the various responses to it.

But last night, the Conservative Party reached a new low; they tried to make fun of the way I look. God gave me a physical defect, and I accepted that since I'm a kid. [sic] It's true, that I speak on one side of my mouth. I'm not a Tory, I don't speak on both sides of my mouth.

— Jean Chretien, 1993. Source video

Though she did not make a full apology for the ad campaign, Campbell ordered the second ad be pulled less than 24 hours after its premiere; she also ordered that the remaining two ads in the campaign not be aired.

Even more beneficial for the Liberals than the anti-Tory backlash was Chrétien's reaction to the commercials. One pundit described them as allowing Chrétien to "make the speech he had been waiting his entire career to deliver." Speaking in Nova Scotia, Chrétien stated that "God gave me a physical defect, and I've accepted that since [I was] a kid." Chrétien poked fun at himself, saying "It's true, that I speak on one side of my mouth. I'm not a Tory, I don't speak on both sides of my mouth."

It is unclear what effect the ad had on the election, as Campbell's Progressive Conservatives were adversely affected by other issues (see Background above).

== Election results and aftermath ==
The election turned out to be one of the most eventful in Canada's history, with more than half of the electorate switching parties from the 1988 election. The Liberals won a landslide majority, capturing 177 of the 295 seats in the 35th Canadian Parliament. Chrétien became Prime Minister as a result, a position he would retain until his retirement from politics a decade later.

By comparison, the Progressive Conservatives' share of Parliament was reduced to only two seats; they lost official party status (and the Parliamentary entitlement and federal funding that accompanies it) as a result. Campbell, who lost her own seat in Vancouver Centre, resigned the party leadership soon after. The PCs never recovered as a federal political party; in 2003, they merged with the Canadian Alliance (the successor of the Reform Party), with the new entity becoming the Conservative Party of Canada. The Conservatives eventually regained power with a minority government in the 2006 federal election.

== See also ==
- 2006 Liberal Party of Canada election ads
