= Allan Gregg in Conversation with... =

Allan Gregg in Conversation with... was a Canadian television series on TVOntario, hosted by Allan Gregg who interviewed various authors, artists and leading thinkers.

The show was terminated in spring 2013 as a result of budget cuts at TVO.
