= Martin Wattenberg (political scientist) =

American political scientist

Martin P. Wattenberg is a political scientist at the University of California, Irvine. He is an expert on American elections and party politics and is co-author of a popular undergraduate college text on American government, Government in America: People, Policy, and Politics, published by Pearson Longman. He is also the author of Where Have All the Voters Gone: The Decline of American Political Parties, Is Voting For Young People?, The Rise of Candidate-Centered Politics, and "Obama: Year One".

Wattenberg and his wife appear in Season 9 of the reality television show Flipping Out as the owners of a Newport Beach home which is undergoing a design renovation.

== Publications ==
- Is Voting for Young People? Longman, 2007.
- Where Have All the Voters Gone? Harvard University Press, 2002.
- Parties Without Partisans: Political Change in Advanced Industrialized Societies (co-edited with Russell Dalton). Oxford University Press, 2000.
- Mixed-Member Electoral Systems: The Best of Both Worlds? (co-edited with Matthew Shugart). Oxford University Press, 2000.
- The Decline of American Political Parties, (sixth edition). Harvard University Press, 1998.
- The Rise of Candidate-Centered Politics: Presidential Elections of the 1980s. Harvard University Press, 1991.
