= Bell's palsy =

Facial paralysis

- A man attempting to show his teeth and raise his eyebrows with Bell's palsy on his right side.
- Specialty: Neurology, Ophthalmology, ENT, oral and maxillofacial surgery
- Symptoms: Inability to move the facial muscles on one side, change in taste, pain around the ear
- Usual onset: Over 48 hours
- Duration: < 6 months
- Causes: Unknown
- Risk factors: Diabetes, recent upper respiratory tract infection
- Diagnostic method: Based on symptoms
- Differential diagnosis: Brain tumor, stroke, Ramsay Hunt syndrome type 2, Lyme disease
- Treatment: Corticosteroids, eye drops, eyepatch
- Prognosis: Most recover completely
- Frequency: 1–4 per 10,000 per year

Bell's palsy is a type of facial paralysis that results in a temporary inability to control the facial muscles on the affected side of the face. In most cases, the weakness is temporary and significantly improves over weeks. Symptoms can vary from mild to severe. They may include muscle twitching, weakness, or total loss of the ability to move one or, in rare cases, both sides of the face. Other symptoms include drooping of the eyebrow, a change in taste, and pain around the ear. Typically symptoms come on over 48 hours. Bell's palsy can trigger an increased sensitivity to sound known as hyperacusis.

The cause of Bell's palsy is unknown and it can occur at any age. Risk factors include diabetes, a recent upper respiratory tract infection, and pregnancy. It results from a dysfunction of cranial nerve VII (the facial nerve). Symptoms may be caused by a viral infection, impaired immunity, infection of the facial nerve, or damage to the facial nerve's myelin sheath. Diagnosis is based on a person's appearance and ruling out other possible causes. Other conditions that can cause facial weakness include brain tumor, stroke, Ramsay Hunt syndrome type 2, myasthenia gravis, and Lyme disease.

The condition normally gets better by itself, with most achieving normal or near-normal function. Corticosteroids have been found to improve outcomes, while antiviral medications may be of a small additional benefit. The eye should be protected from drying up with the use of eye drops or an eyepatch. Surgery is generally not recommended. Often signs of improvement begin within 14 days, with complete recovery within six months. A few may not recover completely or have a recurrence of symptoms.

Bell's palsy is the most common cause of one-sided facial nerve paralysis (70%). It occurs in 1 to 4 per 10,000 people per year. About 1.5% of people are affected at some point in their lives. It most commonly occurs in people between ages 15 and 60. Males and females are affected equally. It is named after Scottish surgeon Charles Bell (1774–1842), who first described the connection of the facial nerve to the condition.

Although defined as a mononeuritis (involving only one nerve), people diagnosed with Bell's palsy may have "myriad neurological symptoms", including "facial tingling, moderate or severe headache/neck pain, memory problems, balance problems, ipsilateral limb paresthesias, ipsilateral limb weakness, and a sense of clumsiness" that are "unexplained by facial nerve dysfunction".

== Signs and symptoms ==
Bell's palsy is characterized by a one-sided facial droop that comes on within 72 hours. In rare cases (<1%), it can occur on both sides resulting in total facial paralysis.

The facial nerve controls many functions, such as blinking and closing the eyes, smiling, frowning, lacrimation, salivation, flaring nostrils and raising eyebrows. It also carries taste sensations from the anterior two thirds of the tongue, through the chorda tympani nerve (a branch of the facial nerve). Because of this, people with Bell's palsy may present with loss of taste sensation in the anterior two thirds of the tongue on the affected side.

The facial nerve innervates the stapedius muscle of the middle ear (through the tympanic branch), which reflexively dampens the conduction of loud sounds. Thus, Bell's Palsy may cause normal sounds to be perceived as very loud (hyperacusis), and dysacusis is possible but hardly ever clinically evident.

== Cause ==
Facial nerve: the facial nerve's nuclei are in the brainstem (represented in the diagram by "θ"). Orange: nerves coming from the left hemisphere of the brain, yellow: nerves coming from the right hemisphere. Note that the forehead muscles receive innervation from both hemispheres (yellow and orange)

The cause of Bell's palsy is unknown. Risk factors include diabetes, a recent upper respiratory tract infection, and pregnancy.

Some viruses are thought to establish a persistent (or latent) infection without symptoms, e.g., the varicella zoster virus and the Epstein–Barr virus, both of the herpes family. Reactivation of an existing (dormant) viral infection has been suggested as a cause of acute Bell's palsy. As the facial nerve swells and becomes inflamed in reaction to the infection, it causes pressure within the Facial canal, resulting in the restriction of blood and oxygen to the nerve cells. Other viral and bacterial infections that have been linked to the development of Bell's palsy include HIV and Lyme disease. This new activation could be triggered by trauma, environmental factors, and metabolic or emotional disorders.

Familial inheritance has been found in 4–14% of cases. There may also be an association with migraines.

In December 2020, the U.S. FDA recommended that recipients of the Pfizer and Moderna COVID-19 vaccines should be monitored for symptoms of Bell's palsy after several cases were reported among clinical trial participants, though the data were not sufficient to determine a causal link.

=== Genetics ===
A meta-analysis of genome-wide association study (GWAS) identified the first unequivocal association with Bell's palsy.

== Pathophysiology ==
Bell's palsy is the result of a malfunction of the facial nerve (cranial nerve VII), which controls the muscles of the face. Facial palsy is typified by an inability to move the muscles of facial expression. The paralysis is of the infranuclear/lower motor neuron type.

It is thought that as a result of inflammation of the facial nerve, pressure is produced on the nerve where it exits the skull within its bony canal (the stylomastoid foramen), blocking the transmission of neural signals or damaging the nerve. Patients with facial palsy for which an underlying cause can be found are not considered to have Bell's palsy per se. Possible causes of facial paralysis include tumor, meningitis, stroke, diabetes mellitus, head trauma and inflammatory diseases of the cranial nerves (sarcoidosis, brucellosis, etc.). In these conditions, the neurologic findings are rarely restricted to the facial nerve. Babies can be born with facial palsy. In a few cases, bilateral facial palsy has been associated with acute HIV infection.

In some research, the herpes simplex virus type 1 (HSV-1) has been identified in a majority of cases diagnosed as Bell's palsy through endoneurial fluid sampling. Other research, however, identified, out of a total of 176 cases diagnosed as Bell's palsy, HSV-1 in 31 cases (18%) and herpes zoster in 45 cases (26%).

In addition, HSV-1 infection is associated with demyelination of nerves. This nerve damage mechanism is different from the above-mentioned—that edema, swelling, and compression of the nerve in the narrow bone canal are responsible for nerve damage. Demyelination may not even be directly caused by the virus but by an unknown immune response.

== Diagnosis ==
Bell's palsy is a diagnosis of exclusion, meaning it is diagnosed by the elimination of other reasonable possibilities. By definition, no specific cause can be determined. There are no routine lab or imaging tests required to make the diagnosis. The degree of nerve damage can be assessed using the House-Brackmann score.

One study found that 45% of patients are not referred to a specialist, which suggests that Bell's palsy is considered by physicians to be a straightforward diagnosis that is easy to manage.

Other conditions that can cause similar symptoms include herpes zoster, Lyme disease, sarcoidosis, stroke, and brain tumors.

=== Differential diagnosis ===
Once the facial paralysis sets in, many people may mistake it as a symptom of a stroke. However, a stroke will usually cause a few additional symptoms, such as numbness or weakness in the arms and legs. And unlike Bell's palsy, a stroke will usually allow patients to control the upper part of their faces. A person with a stroke will usually have some wrinkling on their forehead.

In areas where Lyme disease is common, it accounts for about 25% of cases of facial palsy. In the US, Lyme disease is most common in the New England and Mid-Atlantic states and parts of Wisconsin and Minnesota. The first sign of about 80% of infections, typically one or two weeks after a tick bite, is usually an expanding rash that may be accompanied by headaches, body aches, fatigue, or fever. In up to 10–15% of Lyme infections, facial palsy appears several weeks later, and may be the first sign of infection that is noticed as the Lyme rash typically does not itch and is not painful. The likelihood that the facial palsy is caused by Lyme disease should be estimated based on the recent history of outdoor activities in likely tick habitats during warmer months, a recent history of rash or symptoms such as headache and fever, and whether the palsy affects both sides of the face (much more common in Lyme disease than in Bell's palsy). If that likelihood is more than negligible, a serological test for Lyme disease should be performed, and if it exceeds 10%, empiric therapy with antibiotics should be initiated, without corticosteroids, and reevaluated upon completion of laboratory tests for Lyme disease. Corticosteroids have been found to harm outcomes for facial palsy caused by Lyme disease.

One disease that may be difficult to exclude in the differential diagnosis is the involvement of the facial nerve in infections with the herpes zoster virus. The major differences in this condition are the presence of small blisters, or vesicles, on the external ear, significant pain in the jaw, ear, face, and/or neck, and hearing disturbances, but these findings may occasionally be lacking (zoster sine herpete). Reactivation of existing herpes zoster infection leading to facial paralysis in a Bell's palsy type pattern is known as Ramsay Hunt syndrome type 2. The prognosis for Bell's palsy patients is generally much better than for Ramsay Hunt syndrome type 2 patients.

== Treatment ==
Steroids are effective at improving recovery in Bell's palsy while antivirals have not. In those who are unable to close their eyes, eye-protective measures are required. Management during pregnancy is similar to management in the non-pregnant.

=== Steroids ===
Corticosteroids such as prednisone improve recovery at 6 months and are thus recommended. Early treatment (within 3 days after the onset) is necessary for benefit with a 14% greater probability of recovery. There is some debate regarding the optimal dosing strategy which is generally physician dependent.

=== Antivirals ===
One review found that antivirals (such as aciclovir) are ineffective in improving recovery from Bell's palsy beyond steroids alone in mild to moderate disease. Another review found a benefit when combined with corticosteroids but stated the evidence was not very good to support this conclusion.

In severe disease, it is also unclear. One 2015 review found no effect regardless of severity. Another review found a small benefit when added to steroids.

They are commonly prescribed due to a theoretical link between Bell's palsy and the herpes simplex and varicella zoster virus. There is still the possibility that they might result in a benefit less than 7% as this has not been ruled out.

=== Eye protection ===
When Bell's palsy affects the blink reflex and stops the eye from closing completely, frequent use of tear-like eye drops or eye ointments is recommended during the day, and protecting the eyes with patches or taping them shut is recommended for sleep and rest periods.

=== Physiotherapy ===
Physiotherapy can be beneficial to some individuals with Bell's palsy as it helps to maintain muscle tone of the affected facial muscles and stimulate the facial nerve. It is important that muscle re-education exercises and soft tissue techniques be implemented before recovery to help prevent permanent contractures of the paralyzed facial muscles. To reduce pain, heat can be applied to the affected side of the face. There is no high-quality evidence to support the role of electrical stimulation for Bell's palsy.

=== Surgery ===
Surgery may be able to improve outcomes in facial nerve palsy that has not recovered. A number of different techniques exist. Smile surgery or smile reconstruction is a surgical procedure that may restore the smile for people with facial nerve paralysis. Adverse effects include hearing loss which occurs in 3–15% of people. A Cochrane review (updated in 2021), after reviewing applicable randomized and quasi-randomized controlled trials was unable to determine if early surgery is beneficial or harmful. As of 2007 the American Academy of Neurology did not recommend surgical decompression.

=== Alternative medicine ===
The efficacy of acupuncture remains unknown because the available studies are of low quality (poor primary study design or inadequate reporting practices). There is very tentative evidence for hyperbaric oxygen therapy in severe disease. There is increasing evidence that supports botulinum toxin injection treatments in lowering synkinesis on the affected side of the face and reducing hyperkinesis on the unaffected side, ultimately improving facial symmetry.

== Prognosis ==
Most people with Bell's palsy start to regain normal facial function within three weeks—even those who do not receive treatment. In a 1982 study, when no treatment was available, of 1,011 patients, 85% showed first signs of recovery within three weeks after onset. For the other 15%, recovery occurred 3–6 months later.

After a follow-up of at least one year or until restoration, complete recovery had occurred in more than two-thirds (71%) of all patients. Recovery was judged moderate in 12% and poor in only 4% of patients. Another study found that incomplete palsies disappear entirely, nearly always in one month. The patients who regain movement within the first two weeks nearly always remit entirely. When remission does not occur until the third week or later, a significantly greater part of the patients develop sequelae. A third study found a better prognosis for young patients, aged below 10 years old, while the patients over 61 years old presented a worse prognosis.

Major possible complications of the condition are chronic loss of taste (ageusia), chronic facial spasm, facial pain, and corneal infections. Another complication can occur in case of incomplete or erroneous regeneration of the damaged facial nerve. The nerve can be thought of as a bundle of smaller individual nerve connections that branch out to their proper destinations. During regrowth, nerves are generally able to track the original path to the right destination—but some nerves may sidetrack leading to a condition known as synkinesis. For instance, the regrowth of nerves controlling muscles attached to the eye may sidetrack and also regrow connections reaching the muscles of the mouth. In this way, the movement of one also affects the other. For example, when the person closes the eye, the corner of the mouth lifts involuntarily.

Around 9% of people have some sort of ongoing problems after Bell's palsy, typically the synkinesis already discussed, or spasm, contracture, tinnitus, or hearing loss during facial movement or crocodile-tear syndrome. This is also called gustatolacrimal reflex or Bogorad's syndrome and results in shedding tears while eating. This is thought to be due to faulty regeneration of the facial nerve, a branch of which controls the lacrimal and salivary glands. Gustatorial sweating can also occur.

== Epidemiology ==
The number of new cases of Bell's palsy ranges from about one to four cases per 10,000 population per year. The rate increases with age. Bell's palsy affects about 40,000 people in the United States every year. It affects approximately 1 person in 65 during a lifetime.

A range of annual incidence rates have been reported in the literature: 15, 24, and 25–53 (all rates per 100,000 population per year). Bell's palsy is not a reportable disease, and there are no established registries for people with this diagnosis, which complicates precise estimation.

=== Frequency ===
About 40,000 people are affected by Bell's palsy in the United States every year. It can affect anyone of any sex and age, but its incidence seems to be highest in those in the 15- to 45-year-old age group.

== History ==
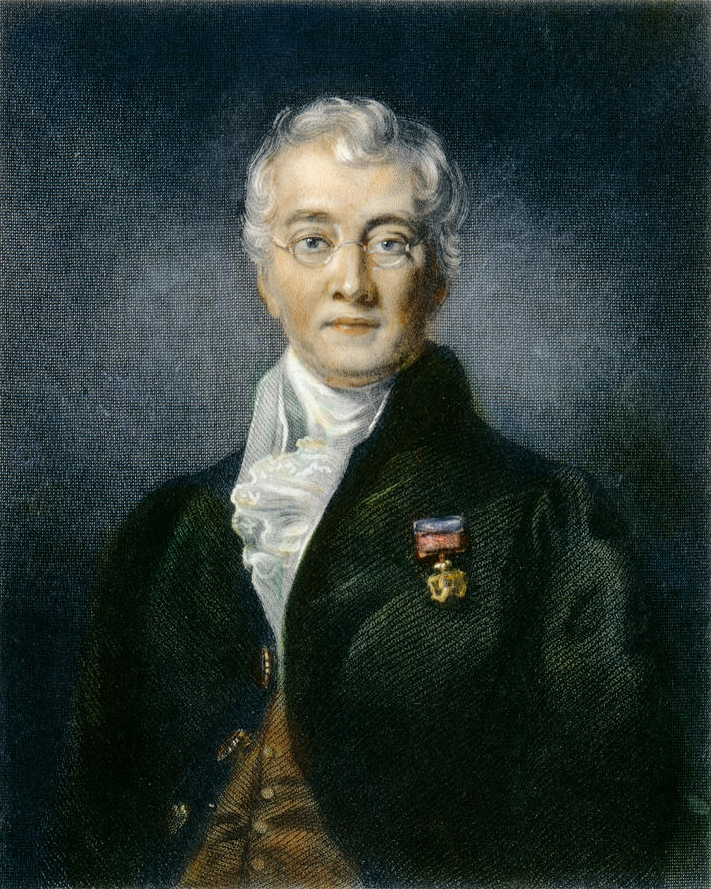
Scottish neurophysiologist Sir Charles Bell was the first author to describe the anatomical basis for facial paralysis, and has since served as the eponym for Bell's palsy.

The Persian physician Muhammad ibn Zakariya al-Razi (865–925) detailed the first known description of peripheral and central facial palsy.

Cornelis Stalpart van der Wiel (1620–1702) in 1683 gave an account of Bell's palsy and credited the Persian physician Ibn Sina (980–1037) for describing this condition before him. James Douglas (1675–1742) and Nicolaus Anton Friedreich (1761–1836) also described it.

Scottish neurophysiologist Sir Charles Bell read his paper to the Royal Society of London on July 12, 1821, describing the role of the facial nerve. He became the first to detail the neuroanatomical basis of facial paralysis. Since then, idiopathic peripheral facial paralysis has been referred to as Bell's palsy, named after him.

A notable person with Bell's palsy is former Prime Minister of Canada Jean Chrétien. During the 1993 federal election, Chrétien's first as leader of the Liberal Party, the opposition Progressive Conservative Party ran an attack ad in which voice actors criticized him over images that seemed to highlight his abnormal facial expressions. The ad was interpreted as an attack on Chrétien's physical appearance and garnered widespread anger among the public, while Chrétien used the ad to make himself more sympathetic to voters. The ad had the adverse effect of increasing Chrétien's lead in the polls and the subsequent backlash clinched the election for the Liberals, who won in a landslide.
