= Testicular cancer =

- Other names: Testis tumor
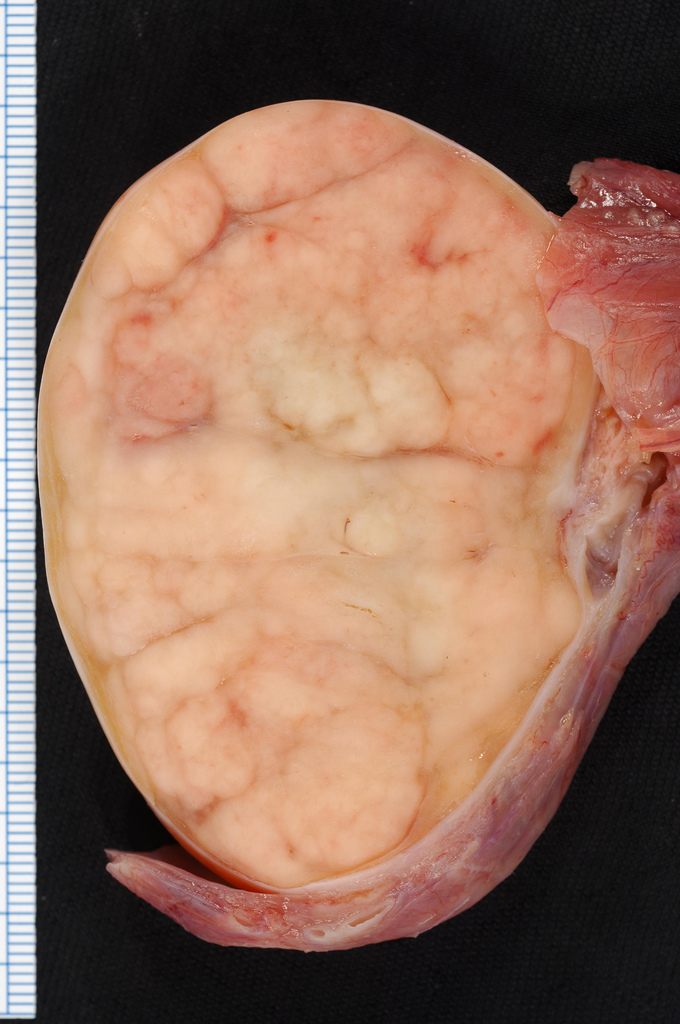
- 7.4 × 5.5-cm seminoma in a radical orchiectomy specimen.
- Specialty: Oncology
- Symptoms: Lump in the testicle, swelling or pain in the scrotum
- Usual onset: 20 to 34 years old males
- Types: Germ cell tumors (seminomas and nonseminomas), sex-cord stromal tumors, lymphomas
- Risk factors: Undescended testis, family history of the disease, phthalate exposure, early initiated cannabis use (Before age 18), previous history of testicular cancer
- Diagnostic method: Physical exam, ultrasound, blood tests, surgical removal of the testicle
- Differential diagnosis: Spermatocele, epididymitis, inguinal hernia, appendix testis
- Treatment: Surgery, radiation therapy, chemotherapy, stem cell transplantation
- Prognosis: Five-year survival rate ~95% (US, 2016–2022)
- Frequency: 686,000 (2015)
- Deaths: 9,400 (2015)

Testicular cancer is cancer that develops in the testicles, a part of the male reproductive system. Symptoms may include a lump in the testicle or swelling or pain in the scrotum. Treatment may result in infertility.

Risk factors include an undescended testis, family history of the disease, and previous history of testicular cancer. More than 95% are germ cell tumors which are divided into seminomas and non-seminomas. Other types include sex-cord stromal tumors and lymphomas. Diagnosis is typically based on a physical exam, ultrasound, and blood tests. Surgical removal of the testicle with examination under a microscope is then done to determine the type.

Testicular cancer is highly treatable and usually curable. Treatment options may include surgery, radiation therapy, chemotherapy, or stem cell transplantation. Even in cases in which cancer has spread widely, chemotherapy offers a cure rate greater than 80%.

Globally, testicular cancer affected about 686,000 people in 2015. That year it resulted in 9,400 deaths up from 7,000 deaths in 1990. Rates are lower in the developing than the developed world. Onset most commonly occurs in males 20 to 34 years old, rarely before 20 years old. The five-year survival rate in the United States is about 95%. Outcomes are better when the disease remains localized.

== Signs and symptoms ==
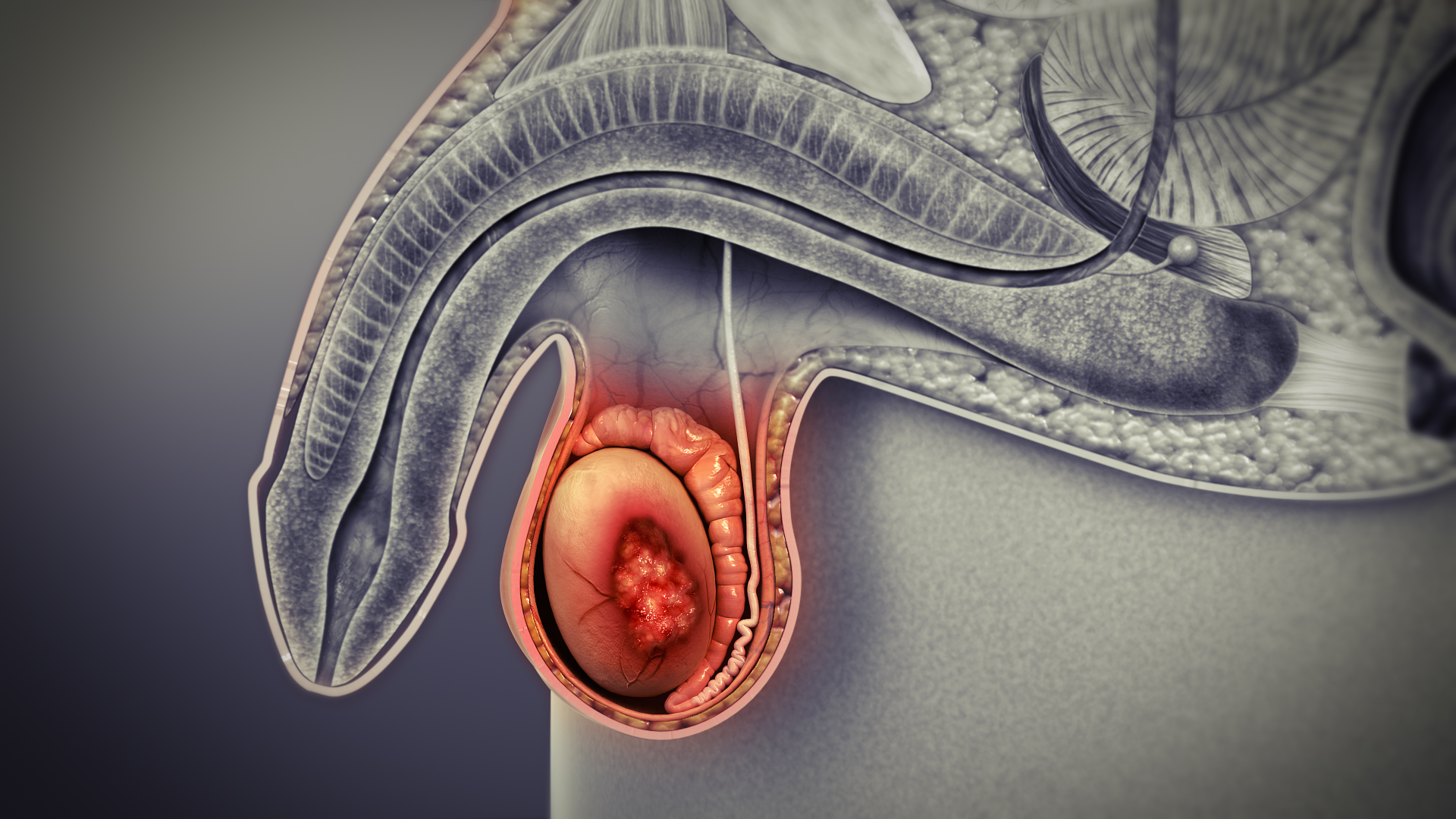
Image showing the first sign of testicular cancer

One of the first signs of testicular cancer is often a lump or swelling in the testicles. The U.S. Preventive Services Task Force (USPSTF) recommends against routine screening for testicular cancer in asymptomatic males, including routine testicular self-exams. However, the American Cancer Society suggests that some men should examine their testicles monthly, especially if they have a family history of cancer, and the American Urological Association recommends monthly testicular self-examinations for all young men.

Symptoms may also include one or more of the following:

- a lump in one testis which may or may not be painful
- sharp pain or a dull ache in the lower abdomen or scrotum
- a feeling often described as "heaviness" in the scrotum
- firmness of the testicle
- breast enlargement (gynecomastia) from hormonal effects of β-hCG
- low back pain (lumbago) due to the cancer spreading to the lymph nodes along the back

It is not very common for testicular cancer to spread to other organs, apart from the lungs. If it has, however, the following symptoms may be present:

- shortness of breath (dyspnea), cough or coughing up blood (hemoptysis) from metastatic spread to the lungs
- a lump in the neck due to metastases to the lymph nodes

Testicular cancer, cryptorchidism, hypospadias, and poor semen quality make up the syndrome known as testicular dysgenesis syndrome.

== Causes ==
A major risk factor for the development of testis cancer is cryptorchidism (undescended testicles). It is generally believed that the presence of a tumor contributes to cryptorchidism; when cryptorchidism occurs in conjunction with a tumor, then the tumor tends to be large. Other risk factors include inguinal hernias, Klinefelter syndrome, and mumps orchitis. Physical activity is associated with decreased risk and sedentary lifestyle is associated with increased risk. Early onset of male characteristics is associated with increased risk. These may reflect endogenous or environmental hormones.

Higher rates of testicular cancer in Western nations have been linked to the use of cannabis. A mounting pattern of studies over time suggesting this possible, but still inconclusive linkage has convinced some doctors and researchers to recommend younger men, especially those with a family history of cystic fibrosis or indirect hernias, to quit or avoid cannabis use as an extra precaution.

== Mechanisms ==
Most testicular germ cell tumors have too many chromosomes, and most often they are triploid to tetraploid. An isochromosome 12p (the short arm of chromosome 12 on both sides of the same centromere) is present in about 80% of testicular cancers, and also other cancers usually have extra material from this chromosome arm through other mechanisms of genomic amplification.

== Diagnosis ==
Micrograph (high magnification) of a seminoma. H&E stain.

The main way testicular cancer is diagnosed is via a lump or mass inside a testis. More generally, if a young male has a single enlarged testicle, which may or may not be painful, this should give doctors reason to suspect testicular cancer.

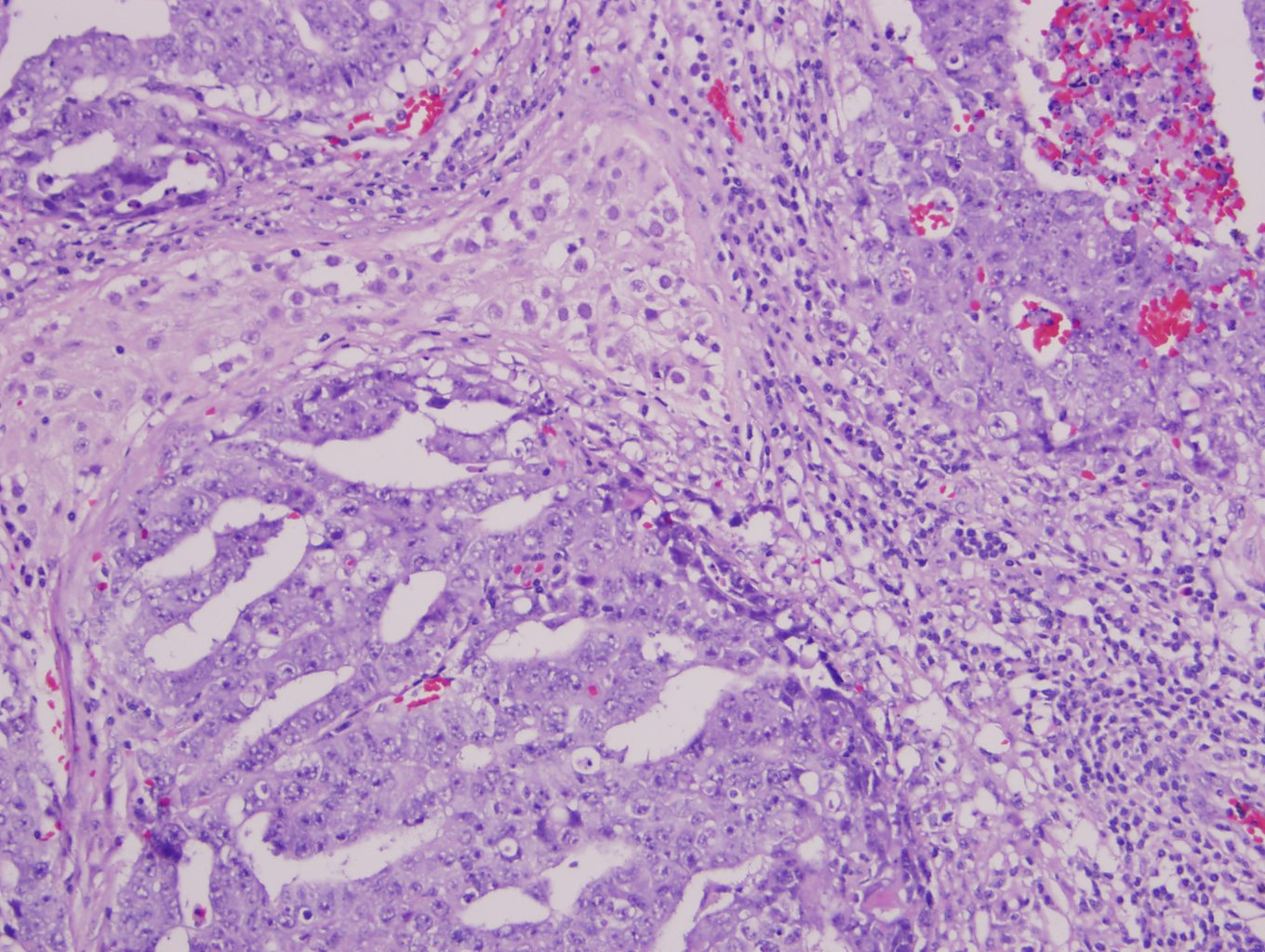
Mixed germ cell tumor containing embryonal carcinoma, seminoma, and yolk sac tumor. The embryonal carcinoma component (upper left, upper right, and lower left) shows pseudoglandular growth with high-grade features of large, epithelioid, anaplastic cells with prominent nucleoli, indistinct cell borders with nuclear overlapping, pleomorphism, and frequent mitoses. The seminoma component (upper center) shows large, round-polyhedral cells with distinct cell membranes, abundant clear/watery cytoplasm, large central nuclei, and prominent nucleoli. The yolk sac component (lower right, hugging the embryonal component) exhibits microcystic/reticular growth pattern.

Other conditions may also have symptoms similar to testicular cancer:

- Epididymitis or epididymo-orchitis
- Hematocele
- Varicocele
- Orchitis
- Prostate infections or inflammations (prostatitis), bladder infections or inflammations (cystitis), or kidney (renal) infections (nephritis) or inflammations which have spread to and caused swelling in the vessels of the testicles or scrotum
- Testicular torsion or a hernia
- Infection, inflammation, retro-peritonitis, or other conditions of the lymph nodes or vessels near the scrotum, testicles, pubis, anorectal area, and groin
- Benign tumors or lesions of the testicles
- Metastasis to the testicles from another primary tumor site(s)

The nature of any palpated lump in the scrotum is often evaluated by scrotal ultrasound, which can determine the exact location, size, and some characteristics of the lump, such as cystic vs solid, uniform vs heterogeneous, sharply circumscribed, or poorly defined. The extent of the disease is evaluated by CT scans, which are used to locate metastases.

The differential diagnosis of testicular cancer requires examining the histology of tissue obtained from an inguinal orchiectomy—that is, surgical excision of the entire testis along with attached structures (epididymis and spermatic cord). A biopsy should not be performed, as it raises the risk of spreading cancer cells into the scrotum.

Inguinal orchiectomy is the preferred method because it lowers the risk of cancer cells escaping. This is because the lymphatic system of the scrotum, through which white blood cells (and, potentially, cancer cells) flow in and out, links to the lower extremities, while that of the testicle links to the back of the abdominal cavity (the retroperitoneum). A trans-scrotal biopsy or orchiectomy will potentially leave cancer cells in the scrotum and create two routes for cancer cells to spread, while in an inguinal orchiectomy, only the retroperitoneal route exists.

Blood tests are also used to identify and measure tumor markers (usually proteins present in the bloodstream) that are specific to testicular cancer. Alpha-fetoprotein, human chorionic gonadotropin (the "pregnancy hormone"), and LDH-1 are the typical tumor markers used to spot testicular germ cell tumors.

A pregnancy test may be used to detect high levels of chorionic gonadotropin; however, the first sign of testicular cancer is usually a painless lump. Note that only about 25% of seminomas have elevated chorionic gonadotropin, so a pregnancy test is not very sensitive for making out testicular cancer.

=== Stressful experiences ===
The stressful event of testicular cancer not only affects the patient who is diagnosed but also affects the caregiver. The psychological stress model consists of stressful experiences that a patient with testicular cancer may go through after diagnosis, that caregivers may want to look out for. The stressful experiences consist of 4 main categories:

- Late side-effects
- Fear of tumor relapse
- Fertility problems
- Social and workplace issues

These side effects may need physical and emotional care, which in turn, can cause the caregiver an emotional burden.

=== Screening ===
The American Academy of Family Physicians recommends against screening males without symptoms for testicular cancer.

=== Staging ===
After removal, the testicle is fixed with Bouin's solution because it better conserves some morphological details such as nuclear conformation. Then the testicular tumor is staged by a pathologist according to the TNM Classification of Malignant Tumors as published in the AJCC Cancer Staging Manual. Testicular cancer is categorized as being in one of three stages (which have subclassifications). The size of the tumor in the testis is irrelevant to staging. In broad terms, testicular cancer is staged as follows:

- Stage I: the cancer remains localized to the testis.
- Stage II: the cancer involves the testis and metastasis to retroperitoneal and/or paraaortic lymph nodes (lymph nodes below the diaphragm).
- Stage III: the cancer involves the testis and metastasis beyond the retroperitoneal and paraaortic lymph nodes. Stage 3 is further subdivided into non-bulky stage 3 and bulky stage 3.

Further information on the detailed staging system is available on the website of the American Cancer Society.

=== Classification ===
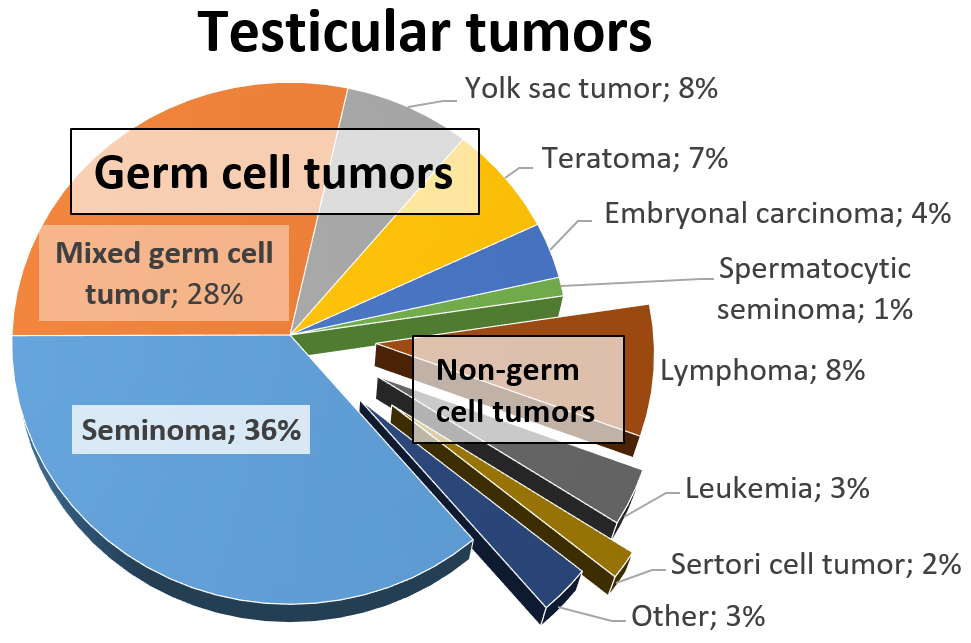
Relative incidences of testicular tumors

Although testicular cancer can be derived from any cell type found in the testicles, more than 95% of testicular cancers are germ cell tumors (GCTs). Most of the remaining 5% are sex cord–gonadal stromal tumours derived from Leydig cells or Sertoli cells. A correct diagnosis is necessary to ensure the most effective and appropriate treatment. To some extent, this can be done via blood tests for tumor markers, but definitive diagnosis requires examination of the histology of a specimen by a pathologist. Testicular tumors are best classified by radical inguinal orchiectomy, which allows for histologic evaluation of the whole testicle and provides local tumor control.

Most pathologists use the World Health Organization classification system for testicular tumors:

- Germ cells derived from germ cell neoplasia in situ
  - Noninvasive germ cell neoplasia
    - Germ cell neoplasia in situ
    - Specific forms of intratubular germ cell neoplasia
    - Gonadoblastoma
  - Germinoma family of tumors
    - Seminoma
  - Nonseminomatous germ cell tumors
    - Embryonal carcinoma
    - Yolk sac tumor, postpubertal type
    - Choriocarcinoma
    - Placental site trophoblastic tumour
    - Epithelioid trophoblastic tumour
    - Teratoma, postpubertal type
    - Teratoma with somatic-type malignancy
  - Mixed germ cell tumors of the testis
    - Mixed germ cell tumors
      - Polyembryoma
      - Diffuse embryoma
  - Germ cell tumors of unknown type
    - Regressed germ cell tumors
- Germ cell tumors unrelated to germ cell neoplasia in situ
  - Spermatocytic tumor
  - Teratoma, prepubertal type
    - Dermoid cyst
    - Epidermoid cyst
  - Yolk sac tumor, prepubertal type
  - Testicular neuroendocrine tumor, prepubertal type
  - Mixed teratoma and yolk sac tumor, prepubertal type
- Sex cord-stromal tumors of the testis
  - Leydig cell tumor
    - Leydig cell tumor
  - Sertoli cell tumor
    - Sertoli cell tumor
    - Large cell calcifying Sertoli cell tumor
  - Granulosa cell tumor
    - Adult granulosa cell tumor
    - Juvenile granulosa cell tumor
  - The fibroma thecoma family of tumors
    - Thecoma
    - Fibroma
  - Mixed and other sex cord-stromal tumors
    - Mixed sex cord-stromal tumor
    - Signet ring stromal tumor
    - Myoid gonadal stromal tumor
    - Sex cord-stromal tumor not otherwise specified
- Secondary tumors of the testis

== Treatment ==
The three basic types of treatment are surgery, radiation therapy, and chemotherapy.

Surgery is performed by urologists; radiation therapy is administered by radiation oncologists; and chemotherapy is the work of medical oncologists. In most patients with testicular cancer, the disease is cured readily with minimal long-term morbidity. While treatment success depends on the stage, the average survival rate after five years is around 95%, and stage 1 cancer cases, if monitored properly, have essentially a 100% survival rate.

=== Testicle removal ===
The initial treatment for testicular cancer is surgery to remove the affected testicle (orchiectomy). While it may be possible, in some cases, to remove testicular cancer tumors from a testis while leaving the testis functional, this is seldom done, as the affected testicle usually contains pre-cancerous cells spread throughout the entire testicle. Thus, removing the tumor alone without additional treatment greatly increases the risk that another cancer will form in that testicle.

Since only one testis is typically required to maintain fertility, hormone production, and other male functions, the affected testis is almost always removed completely in a procedure called inguinal orchiectomy. (The testicle is rarely removed through the scrotum; an incision is made beneath the belt line in the inguinal area.) In the UK, the procedure is known as a radical orchidectomy.

=== Retroperitoneal lymph node dissection ===
In the case of non-seminomas that appear to be stage I, surgery may be done on the retroperitoneal/paraaortic lymph nodes (in a separate operation) to accurately determine whether the cancer is in stage I or stage II and to reduce the risk that malignant testicular cancer cells that may have metastasized to lymph nodes in the lower abdomen. This surgery is called retroperitoneal lymph node dissection (RPLND). However, this approach, while standard in many places, especially in the United States, is out of favor due to costs and the high level of expertise required to perform successful surgery. Sperm banking is frequently carried out before the procedure (as with chemotherapy), as there is a risk that RPLND may damage the nerves involved in ejaculation, causing ejaculation to occur internally into the bladder rather than externally.

Many patients are instead choosing surveillance, where no further surgery is performed unless tests indicate that the cancer has returned. This approach maintains a high cure rate because of the growing accuracy of surveillance techniques.

=== Adjuvant treatment ===
Since testicular cancers can spread, patients are usually offered adjuvant treatment— in the form of chemotherapy or radiotherapy— to kill any cancerous cells that may exist outside of the affected testicle. The type of adjuvant therapy depends largely on the histology of the tumor (i.e., the size and shape of its cells under the microscope) and the stage of progression at the time of surgery (i.e., how far cells have 'escaped' from the testicle, invaded the surrounding tissue, or spread to the rest of the body). If the cancer is not particularly advanced, patients may be offered careful surveillance by periodic CT scans and blood tests, in place of adjuvant treatment.

Before 1970, survival rates from testicular cancer were low. Since the introduction of adjuvant chemotherapy, chiefly platinum-based drugs like cisplatin and carboplatin, the outlook has improved substantially. Although 7000 to 8000 new cases of testicular cancer occur in the United States yearly, only 400 men are expected to die of the disease.

In the UK, a similar trend has emerged: since improvements in treatment, survival rates have risen rapidly to cure rates of over 95%.

=== Radiation therapy ===
Radiation may be used to treat stage II seminoma cancers, or as adjuvant (preventative) therapy in the case of stage I seminomas, to minimize the likelihood that tiny, non-detectable tumors exist and will spread (in the inguinal and para-aortic lymph nodes). Radiation is ineffective against and is therefore never used as a primary therapy for non-seminoma.

=== Chemotherapy ===
==== Non-seminoma ====
Chemotherapy is the standard treatment for non-seminoma when the cancer has spread to other parts of the body (that is, stage 2B or 3). The standard chemotherapy protocol is three, or sometimes four, rounds of Bleomycin-Etoposide-Cisplatin (BEP). BEP as a first-line treatment was first reported by Professor Michael Peckham in 1983. The landmark trial published in 1987 which established BEP as the optimum treatment was conducted by Dr. Lawrence Einhorn at Indiana University. An alternative, equally effective treatment involves the use of four cycles of Etoposide-Cisplatin (EP).

Lymph node surgery may also be performed after chemotherapy to remove masses left behind (stage 2B or more advanced), particularly in the cases of large non-seminomas.

==== Seminoma ====
As an adjuvant treatment, the use of chemotherapy as an alternative to radiation therapy in the treatment of seminoma is increasing, because radiation therapy appears to have more significant long-term side effects (for example, pelvic radiation disease, increased risks of secondary malignancies, etc. See also: Radiation therapy#Late side effects). Two doses, or occasionally a single dose of carboplatin, typically delivered three weeks apart, is proving to be a successful adjuvant treatment, with recurrence rates in the same ranges as those of radiotherapy. The concept of carboplatin as a single-dose therapy was developed by Tim Oliver, Professor of Medical Oncology at Barts and The London School of Medicine and Dentistry. However, very long-term data on the efficacy of adjuvant carboplatin in this setting do not exist.

Since seminoma can recur decades after the primary tumor is removed, patients receiving adjuvant chemotherapy should remain vigilant and not assume they are cured 5 years after treatment.

== Prognosis ==
Treatment of testicular cancer is one of the success stories of modern medicine, with sustained response to treatment in more than 90% of cases, regardless of stage. In 2011 overall cure rates of more than 95% were reported, and 80% for metastatic disease—the best response by any solid tumor, with improved survival being attributed primarily to effective chemotherapy. By 2013 more than 96 percent of the 2,300 men diagnosed each year in the U.K. were deemed cured, a rise by almost a third since the 1970s, the improvement attributed substantially to the chemotherapy drug cisplatin. In the United States, when the disease is treated while it is still localized, more than 99% of people survive 5 years.

=== Surveillance ===
For many patients with stage I cancer, adjuvant (preventative) therapy following surgery may not be appropriate, and patients will undergo surveillance instead. The form this surveillance takes, e.g. the type and frequency of investigations and the length time it should continue, will depend on the type of cancer (non-seminoma or seminoma), but the aim is to avoid unnecessary treatments in the many patients who are cured by their surgery, and ensure that any relapses with metastases (secondary cancers) are detected early and cured. This approach ensures that chemotherapy and or radiotherapy is only given to the patients who need it. The number of patients ultimately cured is the same using surveillance as post-operative "adjuvant" treatments, but the patients have to be prepared to follow a prolonged series of visits and tests.

For both non-seminomas and seminomas, surveillance tests generally include physical examination, blood tests for tumor markers, chest x-rays, and CT scanning. However, the requirements of a surveillance program differ according to the type of disease since, for seminoma patients, relapses can occur later, and blood tests are not as good at indicating relapse.

CT scans are performed on the abdomen (and sometimes the pelvis) and also the chest in some hospitals. Chest X-rays are increasingly preferred for the lungs as they give sufficient detail combined with a lower false-positive rate and significantly smaller radiation dose than CT.

The frequency of CT scans during surveillance should ensure that relapses are detected at an early stage while minimizing radiation exposure.

For patients treated for stage I non-seminoma, a randomized trial (Medical Research Council TE08) showed that, when combined with the standard surveillance tests described above, 2 CT scans at 3 and 12 months were as good as 5 over 2 years in detecting relapse at an early stage.

For patients treated for stage I seminoma who choose surveillance rather than undergoing adjuvant therapy, there have been no randomized trials to determine the optimum frequency of scans and visits, and the schedules vary very widely across the world, and within individual countries. In the UK there is an ongoing clinical trial called TRISST. This is assessing how often scans should take place and whether magnetic resonance imaging (MRI) can be used instead of CT scans. MRI is being investigated because it does not expose the patient to radiation, and so, if it is shown to be as good at detecting relapses, it may be preferable to CT.

For more advanced stages of testicular cancer, and for those cases in which radiation therapy or chemotherapy was administered, the extent of monitoring (tests) after treatment will vary based on the circumstances, but normally should be done for five years in uncomplicated cases and for longer in those with higher risks of relapse.

=== Fertility ===
A man with one remaining testis may remain fertile. However, sperm banking may be appropriate for men who still plan to have children, since fertility may be adversely affected by chemotherapy and/or radiotherapy. A man who loses both testicles will be infertile after the procedure, though he may elect to bank viable, cancer-free sperm before the procedure.

== Psychological factors of testicular cancer ==
Although testicular cancer has a low mortality rate and better prognosis outcomes, psychological factors still affect cancer patients struggling with a diagnosis. This means that the absence of testicles can influence perceptions of masculinity, sexual identity, and body image. Castration or partial removal is associated with fantasies, beliefs, myths, and cultural norms surrounding the testes, which can lead to severe psychological trauma and consequences for the individual. Consequently, worries regarding sexual and reproductive capabilities may induce feelings of despair, inadequacy, and emotional turmoil. Factors that are associated with a decrease in psychological outcomes are early adulthood, partnership status, work status, sexual dysfunction, diminished masculinity, and adaptive mechanisms.

=== Masculinity and sexual identity ===
Biological ideas about masculinity say that human bodies confirm their gender, so changes or damage to our reproductive system can affect how men feel about being men. Since testicles have long been seen as symbols of strength, bravery, and masculinity, having surgery to remove them can change how men with testicular cancer view themselves and what it means to be a man.

==== Social stigma related to masculinity and sexual identity ====
Males aged 18–24 encounter distinct gender-specific social factors that are linked to a decrease in mental health outcomes. These social factors include limited access to health services and engagement, stigma related to masculinity, and cultural expectations. Single or unemployed men are at a higher risk of poorer psychological outcomes that are correlated with an impairment of sexual functions and masculinity. Another factor that is related to experiencing negative effects related to masculinity is not having children, due to not being able to meet traditional expectations of being a protector or provider. Men who felt that losing a testicle made them less masculine also felt negative psychological effects.

New research shows that testicular cancer survivors who have low testosterone levels feel less masculine than those with normal testosterone levels. These concerns are important for adolescent males going through puberty or recently experiencing physical changes, which can shape their developing understanding of their sexual identity. For example, gynecomastia, which is when males develop enlarged breasts during puberty, is a common and normal part of growing up. However, only up to 11% of patients diagnosed with testicular cancer have gynecomastia when they first seek medical attention, and about 4% of males checked for gynecomastia turn out to have testicular cancer. After testicular cancer, some men feel less masculine, but how much cancer affects masculinity varies from person to person.

=== Body image ===
New studies show that 16% of survivors have serious concerns about how they look after the removal of a testicle. These survivors worry about feeling awkward and anxious because of their missing testicles, and they feel different from other people. Even though 52% of survivors felt that their bodies had changed a lot because of cancer and treatment, 88% of the spouses didn't think their partners were any less attractive.

How survivors feel about their bodies is a major factor in the decision to opt for a testicular prosthesis. Many adolescents reported noticeable improvements in body image and self-confidence one year after getting an implant. They also reported being more comfortable during sexual activities.

=== Anxiety and depression ===
After having the testicles removed through orchiectomy, testicular cancer survivors may experience long-lasting feelings of sadness or embarrassment. Research has shown that these emotions are more prevalent among younger and unmarried men compared to older and partnered individuals. The most common psychological problem faced by men diagnosed with testicular cancer is anxiety. New research suggested that there was no direct comparison between people who have been diagnosed with testicular cancer and the general population. Studies show that anxiety is more frequent among testicular cancer survivors of similar gender and age compared to the general population, affecting about 1 in 5 survivors. Depression does not seem to burden testicular cancer patients as much as anxiety.

=== Fear of recurrence ===
Around one out of every three testicular cancer survivors experience significant fear of the cancer coming back, and this fear is considered the most troubling issue for them. Unmarried men reported they felt less fear of cancer recurrence than men who were in a relationship. Survivors who have a fear of recurrence of their cancer tend to have more:

- Intrusive thoughts
- Feel more depressed
- Stressed
- Experience poorer physical well-being

Being diagnosed with testicular cancer often destroys many men's feelings of being invincible and brings up unexpected questions about life and purpose. They feel a sense of being in between or on the threshold of a new identity. This involves feeling disconnected from those who haven't been through a similar intense experience, questioning the purpose of their existence, and becoming more aware of life's fragility and the certainty of death. New research suggests that certain testicular cancer survivors think their cancer was triggered by their stress sensitivity. This may be why some survivors have a fear of recurrence more than 10 years after treatment, even though the actual risk of recurrence is around 1%.

=== Biological and psychological factors of sexual dysfunction ===
Sexual dysfunction can present as a symptom in people who have been diagnosed with testicular cancer. Sexual dysfunction can stem from biological factors, psychological factors, or a blend of both. Difficulties in physiological aspects such as achieving erection and ejaculation are correlated with the severity of the disease and the methods of treatment employed, such as surgery, radiotherapy, or chemotherapy. Conversely, psychological aspects such as libido and satisfaction remain unaffected by the type of treatment received. Nonetheless, treatment approaches for testicular cancer can induce physiological alterations while simultaneously eliciting emotional responses. Therefore, diminished sexual function (such as decreased libido or inhibition) may result from treatment-related physical factors like fatigue, overall discomfort, hair loss, and significant weight fluctuations, as well as emotional factors including concerns about sexual performance, fear of losing control, and ambiguity regarding what lies ahead.

=== Post-traumatic growth from testicular cancer ===
Not every survivor of testicular cancer has negative outcomes of depression, and some may even gain positive outcomes from their experience. This means that when looking at outcomes across all testicular cancer survivors, the positives and negatives could balance each other out. Many cancer survivors, both young and older adults, have reported benefits and personal growth in the months and even years following their diagnosis. Furthermore, researchers have discovered that while the journey of testicular cancer initially brings physical and emotional challenges, it also leads many survivors to develop a newfound gratitude for life. Besides improving mental outlook, going through testicular cancer might also motivate men to adopt healthier behaviors such as:

- More physical activity
- Reduce or stop smoking

These positive changes in lifestyle could contribute to better psychological well-being, which can offset any initial difficulties they face.

== Epidemiology ==
Globally, testicular cancer resulted in 8,300 deaths in 2013, up from 7,000 deaths in 1990. Testicular cancer has the highest prevalence in the U.S. and Europe, and is uncommon in Asia and Africa. Worldwide incidence has doubled since the 1960s, with the highest rates of prevalence in Scandinavia, Germany, and New Zealand.

Although testicular cancer is most common among men aged 20-40 years, it has three peaks: infancy through the age of four as teratomas and yolk sac tumors, ages 25–40 years as post-pubertal seminomas and non-seminomas, and from age 60 as spermatocytic tumors.

Germ cell tumors of the testis are the most common cancer in young men between the ages of 15 and 35 years.

=== United States ===
In the United States, about 9,810 cases are diagnosed each year. The risk of testicular cancer in white men is approximately 4–5 times the risk in black men, and more than three times that of Asian American men. The risk of testicular cancer in Latinos and American Indians is between that of white and Asian men. The cause of these differences is unknown.

=== United Kingdom ===
In the UK, approximately 2,000 people are diagnosed each year. Over a lifetime, the risk is roughly 1 in 200 (0.5%). It is the 16th most common cancer in men. It accounts for less than 1% of cancer deaths in men (around 60 men died in 2012).

== Other animals ==
Testicular tumors also occur in other animals. In horses, these include interstitial cell tumors and teratomas. Typically, the former is found in older stallions (affected stallions may become extremely vicious, suggesting excessive production of androgen), and the latter is found in young horses and is large.

== See also ==
- Men's health
