= Michael J. Duffy =

Irish clinical biochemist and cancer researcher

- Education: University of Galway; University of Manchester (PhD)
- Known for: Urokinase-type plasminogen activator and plasminogen activator inhibitor-1 in breast cancer
- Awards: Abbott Award, International Society of Oncology and BioMarkers (2012); Irish Association for Cancer Research outstanding contribution award (2020)
- Scientific career
- Fields: Clinical biochemistry; Cancer biomarkers; Breast cancer
- Workplaces: St Vincent's University Hospital; University College Dublin
- Website: people.ucd.ie/michael.j.duffy

Michael Joseph Duffy (also known as Joe Duffy) is an Irish clinical biochemist and cancer researcher who has worked on tumour markers, particularly in breast cancer. In 1988 his group reported that high activity of urokinase-type plasminogen activator (uPA) in breast cancer tissue was associated with advanced tumour stage and poor outcome. A 2008 review described this as the first such report. He is an adjunct professor in the School of Medicine at University College Dublin (UCD) and by 2007 was a principal-grade biochemist at St Vincent's University Hospital in Dublin.

Irish Medical Times credited him in 2012 with developing a test for identifying breast cancer patients who may not need chemotherapy. The 2007 and 2016 guidelines of the American Society of Clinical Oncology (ASCO) and the 2019 guideline of the European Society for Medical Oncology (ESMO) included measurement of uPA together with plasminogen activator inhibitor-1 (PAI-1) to estimate recurrence risk and guide decisions on adjuvant chemotherapy in early breast cancer; a footnote to the biomarker algorithm in ASCO's 2022 update said the biomarker was no longer in use.

He has also reviewed circulating tumour markers such as carcinoembryonic antigen and CA 15-3, co-authored a laboratory study of mutant p53 as a possible treatment target in breast cancer, and co-authored tumour-marker guidelines for American and European expert groups. His honours include the 2012 Abbott Award of the International Society of Oncology and BioMarkers and the Irish Association for Cancer Research's 2020 award for outstanding contribution to cancer medicine and research.

== Education and career ==
Duffy graduated from the University of Galway, earned a PhD at the University of Manchester and then held a postdoctoral fellowship at Trinity College Dublin. By 1984 he was working in the Nuclear Medicine Department of St Vincent's Hospital, Dublin, and he was still based there in 1997. He became an adjunct professor in UCD's School of Medicine in 2003, and by 2007 he was principal-grade biochemist at St Vincent's University Hospital.

From 13 December 2012 to 12 December 2017 he sat on the board of Ireland's Health Research Board, to which he was appointed by the Minister for Health.

In 2012 he chaired the National Academy of Clinical Biochemistry (NACB) panel on guidelines for biomarkers in breast cancer and headed the gastrointestinal focus group of the European Group on Tumour Markers (EGTM). He co-authored the 2007 EGTM guidelines on markers in colorectal cancer, the 2008 NACB laboratory-medicine practice guidelines on tumour markers in five cancers and the 2017 EGTM update on biomarkers in breast cancer.

In 2022 he co-edited, with Lakshmi V. Ramanathan and Martin Fleisher, the multi-author volume Cancer Biomarkers: Clinical Aspects and Laboratory Determination (Elsevier). Reviewing it in the Indian Journal of Medical Research, Sanjeev Kumar Gupta described the book as a comprehensive manual on cancer biomarkers for trainees, researchers, oncologists, pathologists and laboratory-medicine practitioners.

== Research ==
=== uPA and PAI-1 ===
uPA is a serine protease implicated in cancer invasion and metastasis. In a 1988 preliminary report in Cancer, Duffy and colleagues found that uPA activity in breast carcinomas correlated with tumour size and the number of involved axillary nodes, and that high activity was associated with a shorter disease-free interval. In their 2008 review, Harbeck and colleagues described this as the first report linking high uPA activity in breast cancer tissue with advanced stage and poor outcome. A prospective validation study by Vanessa Wieder and colleagues, published in 2025, likewise credited Duffy and co-workers with having discovered, nearly 40 years earlier, that patients whose tumours had high uPA activity had a significantly shorter disease-free interval. Duffy's 1990 Cancer Research paper reported that high uPA levels predicted early recurrence and shorter overall survival independently of tumour size, axillary node status and oestradiol receptor status.

Duffy was a co-author of a 2002 pooled analysis in the Journal of the National Cancer Institute that investigated uPA together with PAI-1 in 8,377 breast cancer patients from the European Organisation for Research and Treatment of Cancer Receptor and Biomarker Group; high levels of both proteins were independently associated with poorer relapse-free and overall survival. A 2004 review by Harbeck and colleagues described uPA and PAI-1 as the first novel tumour biological factors in breast cancer to be validated at the highest level of evidence.

ASCO's 2007 tumour-marker guideline recommended uPA and PAI-1 for determining prognosis in patients with newly diagnosed node-negative breast cancer. It stated that low levels of both markers indicated a risk of recurrence low enough that chemotherapy would add only minimal benefit, and that patients at high risk as determined by high levels of both gained substantial benefit from CMF-based adjuvant chemotherapy. In December 2007 Irish Medical Times reported that a test developed at St Vincent's was to be used internationally to help decide whether women with breast cancer should receive chemotherapy; Duffy said he had worked with a number of doctors over the previous decade to develop it. A January 2008 UCD news release said that he had led the team at the UCD Conway Institute and St Vincent's that developed the uPA test.

The 2016 ASCO guideline on biomarkers for adjuvant systemic therapy stated that clinicians could use uPA and PAI-1 in hormone-receptor-positive, HER2-negative, node-negative breast cancer, and should not use them in HER2-positive or triple-negative disease. The 2019 ESMO early-breast-cancer guideline gave uPA/PAI-1 a level I, grade A rating for prognostic value, while noting that the assay was not extensively used. ASCO's 2022 update still listed uPA and PAI-1 in its biomarker algorithm, and its appendix summary of recommendations kept the option of using them in oestrogen-receptor-positive, HER2-negative, node-negative disease; a footnote to the algorithm, however, said that the biomarker was no longer in use.

=== Circulating tumour markers ===
Duffy has reviewed the clinical value of circulating markers already in routine use. His 2001 review of carcinoembryonic antigen (CEA) in colorectal cancer concluded that the marker was of little use for detecting early disease but that serial measurements were recommended for detecting spread to the liver. A 2006 review of serum markers in breast cancer found none of value for detecting early disease, and identified the most important clinical application of CA 15-3 as monitoring therapy in advanced breast cancer that cannot be assessed by existing clinical or radiological procedures.

=== Triple-negative breast cancer ===
With John Crown and others in the Irish Cancer Society research centre BREAST-PREDICT, Duffy co-authored a laboratory study of mutant p53 as a possible treatment target in triple-negative breast cancer. The 2017 International Journal of Cancer paper, led by his PhD student Naoise Synnott, tested APR-246, a compound reported to reactivate mutant p53, in a panel of breast cancer cell lines; response did not depend on molecular subtype, but cell lines with mutated p53 were more sensitive to it. The authors proposed targeting mutant p53 as a potential approach for p53-mutated breast cancer, including triple-negative disease. The Irish Examiner and TheJournal.ie reported the laboratory findings in 2016, noting that the work was supervised by Duffy and Crown.

== Selected publications ==
- Duffy, M. J.; Reilly, D.; O'Sullivan, C.; et al. (1990). "Urokinase-plasminogen activator, a new and independent prognostic marker in breast cancer". Cancer Research. 50 (21): 6827–6829. PMID 2119883.
- Look, M. P.; van Putten, W. L. J.; Duffy, M. J.; et al. (2002). "Pooled analysis of prognostic impact of urokinase-type plasminogen activator and its inhibitor PAI-1 in 8377 breast cancer patients". Journal of the National Cancer Institute. 94 (2): 116–128. doi:10.1093/jnci/94.2.116. hdl:1765/9823. PMID 11792750.
- Duffy, Michael J. (2006). "Urokinase-Type Plasminogen Activator and PAI-1". In Gasparini, Giampietro; Hayes, Daniel F. (eds.). Biomarkers in Breast Cancer. Cancer Drug Discovery and Development. Humana Press. pp. 111–128. doi:10.1385/1-59259-915-X:111. ISBN 978-1-58829-227-8.
- Sturgeon, Catharine M.; Duffy, Michael J.; Stenman, Ulf-Håkan; et al. (2008). "National Academy of Clinical Biochemistry laboratory medicine practice guidelines for use of tumor markers in testicular, prostate, colorectal, breast, and ovarian cancers". Clinical Chemistry. 54 (12): e11–e79. doi:10.1373/clinchem.2008.105601. PMID 19042984.
- Duffy, M. J.; Harbeck, N.; Nap, M.; et al. (2017). "Clinical use of biomarkers in breast cancer: updated guidelines from the European Group on Tumor Markers (EGTM)". European Journal of Cancer. 75: 284–298. doi:10.1016/j.ejca.2017.01.017. PMID 28259011.
- Ramanathan, Lakshmi V.; Fleisher, Martin; Duffy, Michael J., eds. (2022). Cancer Biomarkers: Clinical Aspects and Laboratory Determination. Elsevier. doi:10.1016/C2020-0-01610-5. ISBN 978-0-12-824302-2.

== Awards and honours ==
In 1983, Duffy gave the St Luke's Lecture, an annual oncology lecture sponsored by the Royal Academy of Medicine in Ireland (RAMI) and St Luke's Hospital; published in the Irish Journal of Medical Science in 1984. In 1997 he gave RAMI's Conway Review Lecture, on the biological and clinical aspects of cancer metastasis. In 1993, he gave the Royal Irish Academy's National Committee for Biochemistry Award Medal Lecture, and in 2013 he received RAMI's Lifetime Achievement Award. He received the International Society of Oncology and BioMarkers' Abbott Award in 2012 and the Irish Association for Cancer Research award for outstanding contribution to cancer medicine and research in 2020.
