= Germ cell neoplasia in situ =

Intratubular germ cell neoplasia
- Other names: Intratubular germ cell neoplasia (ITGCN or IGCN), testicular intratubular germ cell neoplasia, intratubular germ cell neoplasia of the testis
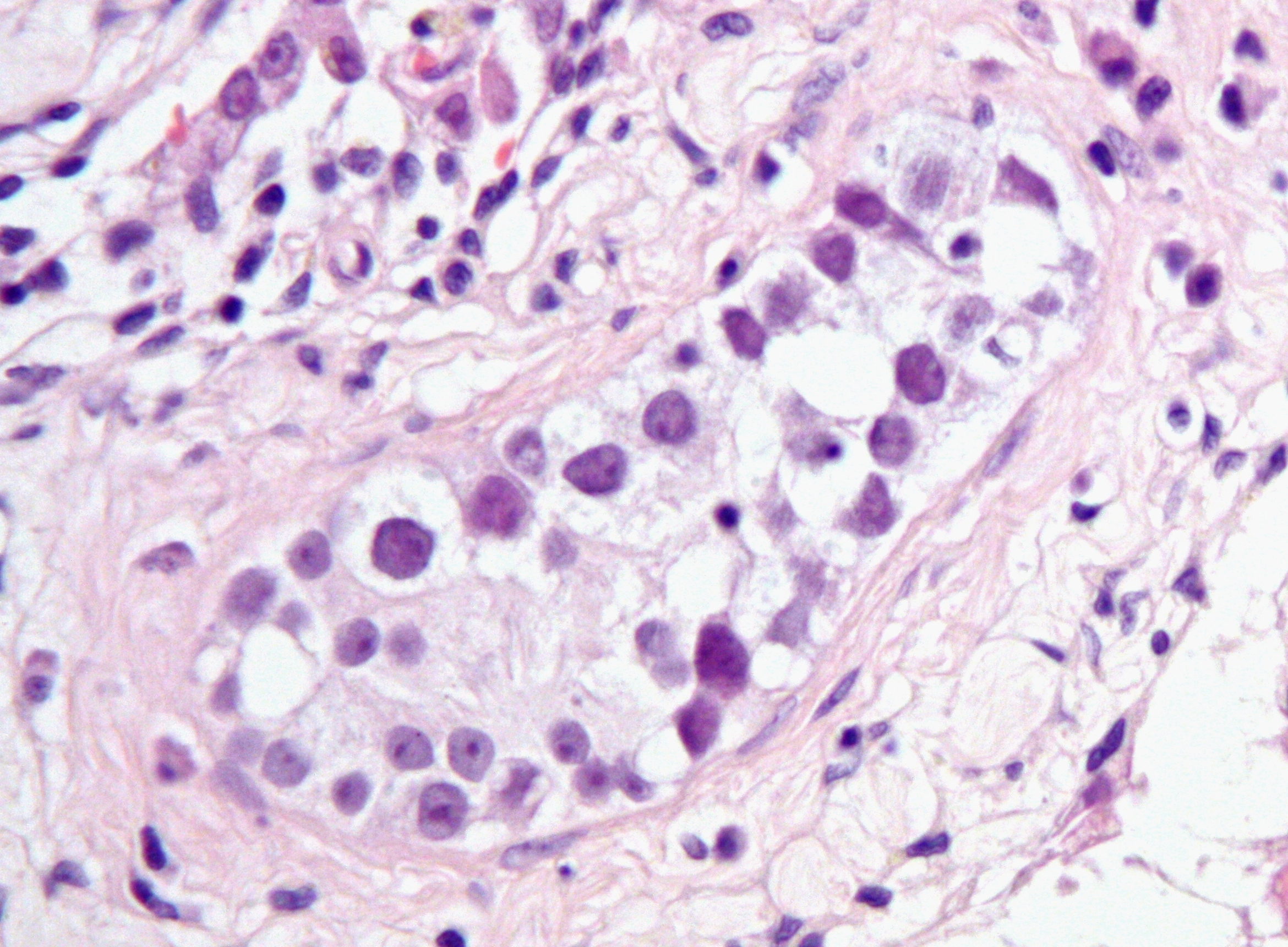
- Intratubular germ cell neoplasia. H&E stain.
- Specialty: Pathology, urology

Germ cell neoplasia in situ (GCNIS) represents the precursor lesion for many types of testicular germ cell tumors.

The term GCNIS was introduced with the 2016 edition of the WHO classification of urological tumours. GCNIS more accurate describes the lesion as it arises between the basement membrane and Sertoli cells (the cells that 'nurse' the developing germ cell). The common, unspecified variant of the entity was once considered to be a carcinoma in situ, although the term "carcinoma in situ" is now largely historical as it is not an accurate description of the process.

== Classification ==
The World Health Organization classification of testicular tumours subdivides ITGCN into (1) a more common, unspecified type (ITGCNU), and (2) other specific subtypes. The most common specific subtypes are intratubular embryonal carcinoma and intratubular seminoma.

== Cancer risk ==
GCNIS is seen in the following settings:

- Almost all invasive germ cell tumours of the testis in adults
- Fifty percent of patients with GCNIS developed invasive germ cell tumours within five years of initial diagnosis.
- Five percent of contralateral testes in men with a history of prior testicular germ cell tumour.
- Less than five percent of cryptorchid testes.
- Less than one percent of patients with infertility.

== Germ cell tumors that do not arise from ITGCNU ==
Not all germ cell tumors (GCTs) arise from intratubular germ cell neoplasia. The following testicular GCTs do not arise from ITGCN:

- Spermatocytic tumor
- Pediatric Yolk sac tumors (endodermal sinus tumour). This is currently an area of controversy as some authors dispute the absence of ITGCN in these cases.
- Teratoma (rare exceptions)

== Diagnosis ==
GCNIS is not palpable, and not visible on macroscopic examination of testicular tissue. Microscopic examination of affected testicular tissue most commonly shows germ cells with enlarged hyperchromatic nuclei with prominent nucleoli and clear cytoplasm. These cells are typically arranged along the basement membrane of the tubule, and mitotic figures are frequently seen. The sertoli cells are pushed toward the lumen by the neoplastic germ cells, and spermatogenesis is almost always absent in the affected tubules. Pagetoid spread of GCNIS into the rete testis is common. Immunostaining with placental alkaline phosphatase (PLAP) highlights GCNIS cell membranes in 95 percent of cases. OCT3/4 is a sensitive and specific nuclear stain of GCNIS.

== Treatment ==
GCNIS is generally treated by radiation therapy and/or orchiectomy. Chemotherapy used for metastatic germ cell tumours may also eradicate GCNIS.

== See also ==
- Carcinoma in situ
- Germ cell tumor

== Additional images ==
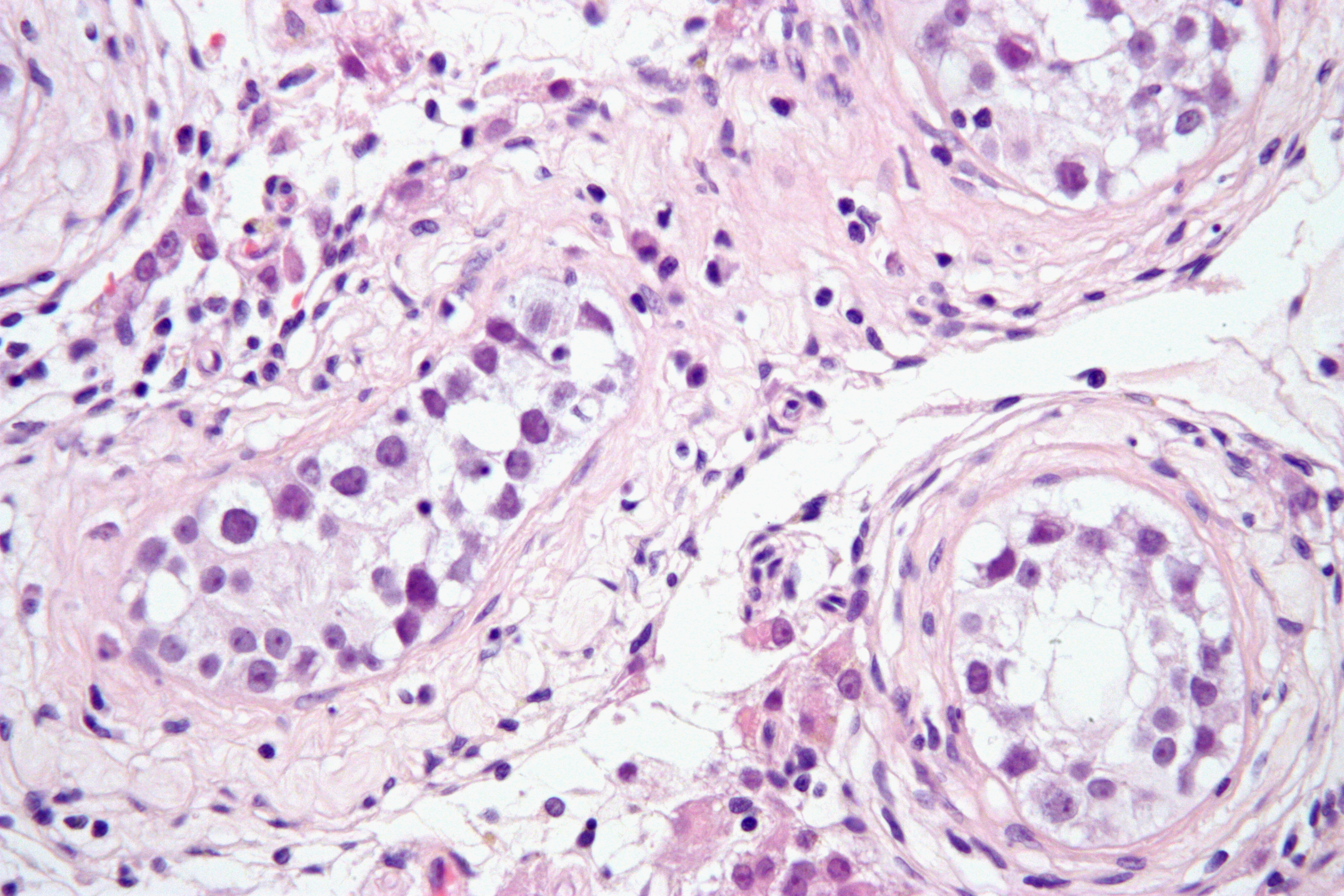
ITGCN. H&E stain.
