= CA 15-3 =

Tumor marker

CA 15-3, for Cancer Antigen 15-3, is a tumor marker for many types of cancer, most notably breast cancer.

It is derived from MUC1. CA 15-3 and associated CA 27-29 are different epitopes on the same protein antigen product of the breast cancer-associated MUC1 gene.

Elevated CA15-3, in conjunction with alkaline phosphatase (ALP), was found to be associated with an increased chance of early recurrence in breast cancer.

Both CA 15-3 and CA 27-29 may be elevated in patients with benign ovarian cysts, benign breast disease, and benign liver disease. Elevations may also be seen in cirrhosis, sarcoidosis and lupus.
