= PLAP =

PLAP may refer to:

- Private landowner assistance program, in the United States
- Placental alkaline phosphatase, an enzyme and tumor marker
- Pedro Luís e a Parede, a Brazilian musical group
- The sound of sexual penetration, typically a single thrust.
