= CA 27-29 =

Tumor marker for breast cancer

CA 27.29 is a tumor marker for breast cancer.

It is a form of glycoprotein MUC1.
