= Alkaline phosphatase =

Homodimeric protein enzyme

- Structure of alkaline phosphatase.

Identifiers
- Symbol: Alk_phosphatase
- Pfam: PF00245
- Pfam clan: CL0088
- ECOD: 7515.1.1
- InterPro: IPR001952
- SMART: SM00098
- PROSITE: PDOC00113
- SCOP2: 1alk / SCOPe / SUPFAM
Available protein structures:
- PDB: 1aja, 1ajb, 1ajc, 1ajd, 1alh, 1ali, 1alj, 1alk, ,1anj 1ani ,1anj, 1b8j, 1ed8, 1ed9, 1elx, 1ely, 1elz, ,1ew8 1ew2 ,1ew8, 1ew9, 1hjk, 1hqa, 1k7h, 1kh4, 1kh5, ,1kh9 1kh7 ,1kh9, 1khj, 1khk, 1khl, 1khn, 1shn, 1shq, ,1urb 1ura ,1urb, 1y6v, 1y7a, 1zeb, 1zed, 1zef, 2anh, ,2ga3 2g9y ,2ga3, 2glq IPR001952 PF00245 (ECOD; PDBsum)
- AlphaFold: IPR001952; PF00245

Alkaline phosphatase
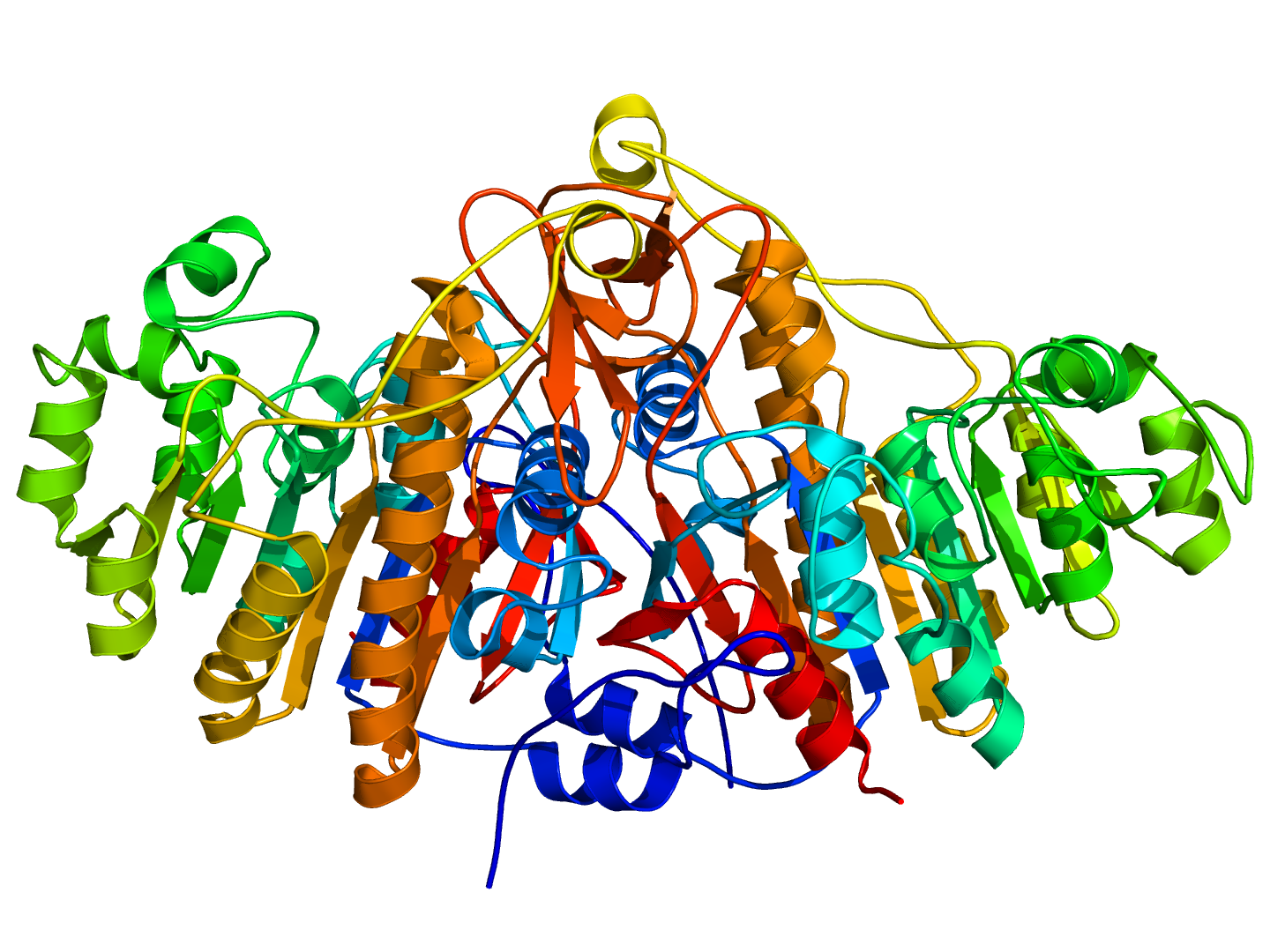
- Ribbon diagram (rainbow-color, N-terminus = blue, C-terminus = red) of the dimeric structure of bacterial alkaline phosphatase.

Identifiers
- EC no.: 3.1.3.1
- CAS no.: 9001-78-9
- Alt. names: alkaline phosphomonoesterase, alkaline phosphatase, alkaline phosphohydrolase, alkaline phenyl phosphatase

Databases
- BRENDA: enzyme data
- ExPASy: NiceZyme view
- KEGG: enzyme entry
- MetaCyc: metabolic pathway
- Rhea: reactions
- PDB structures: RCSB PDB PDBe PDBsum
- Gene Ontology: AmiGO / QuickGO
Search
- PMC: articles
- PubMed: articles
- NCBI: proteins

Alkaline phosphatases (ALPs) are enzymes that hydrolyze phosphate monoesters, releasing inorganic phosphate. They occur in both prokaryotes and eukaryotes and are generally most active at alkaline pH.

In humans, alkaline phosphatase occurs as several isoenzymes found in tissues including the liver, bone, intestine, and placenta. Measurement of alkaline phosphatase activity in blood helps evaluate liver and bone disorders. Alkaline phosphatases are also used in molecular biology, in enzyme immunoassays, and to verify milk pasteurization.

== Genes and isoenzymes ==
=== Humans ===
Humans and most other mammals contain the following alkaline phosphatase isozymes:

- ALPI – intestinal (molecular mass of 150 kDa)
- ALPL – tissue-nonspecific (expressed mainly in liver, bone, and kidney)
- ALPP – placental (Regan isozyme)
- ALPG – germinal tissues

Four genes encode the four isozymes. The gene for tissue-nonspecific alkaline phosphatase is located on chromosome 1, and the genes for the other three isoforms are located on chromosome 2.

== Structure ==
Alkaline phosphatase is a homodimeric enzyme composed of two identical subunits. Each subunit contains a catalytic site with two Zn^{2+} ions and one Mg^{2+} ion, which are required for enzymatic activity. The Escherichia coli enzyme has a molecular mass of approximately 86 kDa, with each subunit comprising 429 amino acid residues. Its fully metal-occupied form can be represented as (Zn_{A}Zn_{B}Mg_{C})_{2}, where A and B denote the zinc-binding sites and C denotes the magnesium-binding site. Substrate coordination by the zinc ions contributes to catalysis.

Compared with the bacterial enzyme, mammalian alkaline phosphatases generally have higher specific activities and K_{m} values, more alkaline pH optima, and lower thermal stability. They are typically membrane-bound and exhibit uncompetitive inhibition by certain L-amino acids and peptides. These properties vary among mammalian isoenzymes.

Alkaline phosphatases belong to a larger enzyme superfamily whose members share structural features and aspects of their catalytic mechanisms despite differences in substrate specificity. Related enzymes include nucleotide pyrophosphatases/phosphodiesterases and arylsulfatases. Structural similarities support a common evolutionary origin for these enzyme families; the superfamily also includes the phosphodiesterase autotaxin.

== Function ==
=== Catalytic properties and inhibition ===
The principal features of the catalytic mechanism are conserved between bacterial and mammalian alkaline phosphatases. These enzymes hydrolyze phosphate monoesters and can also catalyze transphosphorylation at high concentrations of phosphate acceptors.

All mammalian alkaline phosphatase isoenzymes except placental (PALP and SEAP) are inhibited by homoarginine, and, in similar manner, all except the intestinal and placental ones are blocked by levamisole. Phosphate is another inhibitor which competitively inhibits alkaline phosphatase.

=== Bacterial ===
In gram-negative bacteria, such as Escherichia coli, alkaline phosphatase is located in the periplasmic space, external to the inner cell membrane and within the peptidoglycan portion of the cell wall. Since the periplasmic gap is more prone to environmental variation than the inner cell, alkaline phosphatase is suitably resistant to inactivation, denaturation, or degradation. This characteristic of the enzyme is uncommon to many other proteins.

The precise structure and function of the isozyme in E. coli is solely geared to supply a source of inorganic phosphate when the environment lacks this metabolite. The inorganic phosphates are then bound to carrier proteins which deliver the inorganic phosphates to a specific high-affinity transport system, known as the phosphate-specific transport system, which transports phosphate across the cytoplasmic membrane.

While the outer membrane of E. coli contains porins that are permeable to phosphorylated compounds, the inner membrane does not. An issue arises in how to transport such compounds across the inner membrane and into the cytosol. The strong anionic charge of phosphate groups along with the remainder of the compound make phosphorylated compounds very much immiscible in the nonpolar region of the bilayer. The solution arises in cleaving the phosphate group away from the compound via ALP for translocation into the cytosol. The main purpose of dephosphorylation by alkaline phosphatase is to increase the rate of diffusion of phosphorylated molecules into the cells while inhibiting them from diffusing out.

Alkaline phosphatase in E. coli is uncommonly soluble and active within elevated temperature conditions such as 80 °C. Due to the kinetic energy induced by this temperature the weak hydrogen bonds and hydrophobic interactions of common proteins become degraded and therefore coalesce and precipitate. However, upon dimerization of alkaline phosphatase, the bonds maintaining its secondary and tertiary structures are effectively buried such that they are not affected as much at this temperature. Furthermore, even at more elevated temperatures such as 90 °C alkaline phosphatase has the unusual characteristic of reverse denaturation. Due to this, although it ultimately denatures at about 90 °C it has the added ability to accurately reform its bonds and return to its original structure and function once cooled back down.

Alkaline phosphatase in E. coli is located in the periplasmic space and can thus be released using techniques that weaken the cell wall and release the protein. Due to the location of the enzyme, and the protein layout of the enzyme, the enzyme is in solution with a smaller amount of proteins than there are in another portion of the cell. The proteins' heat stability can also be taken advantage of when isolating this enzyme (through heat denaturation). Some complexities of bacterial regulation and metabolism suggest that other, more subtle, purposes for the enzyme may also play a role for the cell. In the laboratory, however, mutant Escherichia coli lacking alkaline phosphatase survive quite well, as do mutants unable to shut off alkaline phosphatase production.

The optimal pH for the activity of the E. coli enzyme is 8.0 while the bovine enzyme optimum pH is slightly higher at 8.5. Alkaline phosphatase accounts for 6% of all proteins in derepressed cells.

==== Heterodimeric alkaline phosphatase ====
When multiple copies of a polypeptide encoded by a gene form an aggregate, this protein structure is referred to as a multimer. When a multimer is formed from polypeptides produced by two different mutant alleles of a particular gene, the mixed multimer may exhibit greater functional activity than the unmixed multimers formed by each of the mutants alone. In such a case, the phenomenon is referred to as intragenic complementation. E. coli alkaline phosphatase, a dimer enzyme, exhibits intragenic complementation.

=== Human ===
In humans, alkaline phosphatase is present in all tissues throughout the body, but is particularly concentrated in the liver, bile duct, kidney, bone, intestinal mucosa and placenta. In the serum, two types of alkaline phosphatase isozymes predominate: skeletal and liver. During childhood the majority of alkaline phosphatase are of skeletal origin.

==== Tissue-nonspecific alkaline phosphatase ====
The enzyme encoded by the ALPL gene hydrolyzes extracellular inorganic pyrophosphate, which inhibits mineralization.

==== Intestinal alkaline phosphatase ====
Intestinal alkaline phosphatase is secreted by enterocytes, and seems to play a pivotal role in intestinal homeostasis and protection as well as in suppressing inflammation via repression of the downstream Toll-like receptor (TLR)-4-dependent and MyD88-dependent inflammatory cascade. It dephosphorylates toxic/inflammatory microbial ligands like lipopolysaccharides (LPSs), unmethylated cytosine-guanine dinucleotides, flagellin, and extracellular nucleotides such as uridine diphosphate or ATP. Dephosphorylation of LPS by IAP can reduce the severity of Salmonella tryphimurium and Clostridioides difficile infection restoring normal gut microbiota. Thus, altered IAP expression has been implicated in chronic inflammatory diseases such as inflammatory bowel disease (IBD). It also seems to regulate lipid absorption and bicarbonate secretion in the duodenal mucosa, which regulates the surface pH.

== Clinical significance ==
=== Serum alkaline phosphatase ===
==== Measurement and interpretation ====
Blood tests should always be interpreted using the reference range from the laboratory that performed the test.

The source of elevated levels can be deduced by obtaining serum levels of γ-glutamyltransferase. Concomitant increases of alkaline phosphatase with γ-glutamyltransferase should raise the suspicion of hepatobiliary disease. When the cause is unclear, isoenzyme studies using electrophoresis can confirm the source of the increase.

Bone-specific alkaline phosphatase has been studied as a marker of bone formation in children and adolescents.

==== Elevated levels ====
As of 2020, normal ALP levels were "not well defined", and there tend to be variations by sex and racial background, and by age, with children and adolescents having markedly higher levels.

- Pregnancy

Also, the level of alkaline phosphatase increases if there is active bone formation occurring, as the enzyme is a byproduct of osteoblast activity (such as the case in Paget's disease of bone).

Levels are also elevated in people with untreated coeliac disease.

There are many possible explanations for elevated ALP. Skelphosphatase (which is localized in osteoblasts and extracellular layers of newly synthesized matrix) is released into circulation by a yet unclear mechanism. Conditions associated with elevated serum alkaline phosphatase include the following:

Placental alkaline phosphatase is elevated in seminomas and active forms of rickets, as well as in the following diseases and conditions:

- Biliary obstruction
- Bone conditions
- Osteoblastic bone tumors
- Osteomalacia
- Rickets
- Osteoporosis
- Hepatitis
- Mononucleosis
- Cirrhosis
- Acute cholecystitis
- Myelofibrosis
- Leukemoid reaction
- Congestive heart failure
- Lymphoma
- Paget's disease
- Sarcoidosis
- Hyperthyroidism
- Hyperparathyroidism
- Myocardial infarction
- Cholangitis
- Ischemic cholangiopathy
- High doses of estrogens

==== Lowered levels ====
Low serum alkaline phosphatase levels are less common than elevated levels.

The following conditions or diseases may lead to reduced levels of alkaline phosphatase:

- Hypophosphatasia, a genetic disorder
- Women receiving estrogen therapy for menopausal symptoms
- Estrogen-containing oral contraceptives
- Men with recent heart surgery, malnutrition, magnesium deficiency, or severe anemia
- Children with achondroplasia and congenital iodine deficiency
- Children after a severe episode of enteritis
- Pernicious anemia
- Aplastic anemia
- Wilson's disease
- Hypothyroidism
- Zinc deficiency
- Malnutrition
- Steroid treatment
- Colitis
- Thyroid disease

=== Cancer-associated expression and prognosis ===
Studies show that the alkaline phosphatase protein found in cancer cells is similar to that found in nonmalignant body tissues and that the protein originates from the same gene in both. One study compared the enzymes of liver metastases of giant-cell lung carcinoma and nonmalignant placental cells. The two were similar in NH_{2}-terminal sequence, peptide map, subunit molecular weight, and isoelectronic point.

In a different study in which scientists examined alkaline phosphatase protein presence in a human colon cancer cell line, also known as HT-29, results showed that the enzyme activity was similar to that of the non-malignant intestinal type. However, this study revealed that without the influence of sodium butyrate, alkaline phosphatase activity is fairly low in cancer cells. A study based on sodium butyrate effects on cancer cells conveys that it has an effect on androgen receptor co-regulator expression, transcription activity, and also on histone acetylation in cancer cells. This explains why the addition of sodium butyrate show increased activity of alkaline phosphatase in the cancer cells of the human colon. In addition, this further supports the theory that alkaline phosphatase enzyme activity is actually present in cancer cells.

In another study, choriocarcinoma cells were grown in the presence of 5-bromo-2'-deoxyuridine and results conveyed a 30- to 40-fold increase in alkaline phosphatase activity. This procedure of enhancing the activity of the enzyme is known as enzyme induction. The evidence shows that there is in fact activity of alkaline phosphatase in tumor cells, but it is minimal and needs to be enhanced. Results from this study further indicate that activities of this enzyme vary among the different choriocarcinoma cell lines and that the activity of the alkaline phosphatase protein in these cells is lower than in the non-malignant placenta cells.

The level of alkaline phosphatase is much more elevated in metastatic prostate cancer cells than non-metastatic prostate cancer cells. High levels of ALP in prostate cancer patients is associated with a significant decrease in survival.

Measuring alkaline phosphatase (along with prostate specific antigen) during, and after six months of hormone treated metastatic prostate cancer was shown to predict the survival of patients.

=== Leukocyte alkaline phosphatase ===
Leukocyte alkaline phosphatase is found within mature white blood cells. White blood cell levels of LAP can help in the diagnosis of certain conditions.

- Higher than typical levels are seen in the physiological response, the leukemoid reaction, and in pathologies that include mature white blood cells, such as polycythemia vera, essential thrombocytosis, and in primary myelofibrosis.
- Lower than typical levels are found in pathologies that involve undeveloped leukocytes, such as chronic myelogenous leukemia (CML), paroxysmal nocturnal hemoglobinuria and acute myelogenous leukaemia.

Leukocyte alkaline phosphatase activity can be assessed by staining a blood smear and scoring the intensity of staining in individual leukocytes.

== Applications ==
=== Laboratory uses ===
By changing the amino acids of the wild-type alkaline phosphatase enzyme produced by Escherichia coli, a mutant alkaline phosphatase is created which not only has a 36-fold increase in enzyme activity, but also retains thermal stability.

Common alkaline phosphatases used in research include:

- Shrimp alkaline phosphatase (SAP), from a species of Arctic shrimp (Pandalus borealis). This phosphatase is easily inactivated by spiking up the temperature, a useful feature in some applications.
- Calf-intestinal alkaline phosphatase (CIP) typically useful in molecular cloning, where DNA undergoes recombination and no new DNA is made. In addition, it is useful in detoxifying mediated lipopolysaccharide inflammatory responses thus a drug for lipopolysaccharide mediated disease.
- Placental alkaline phosphatase (PLAP) and its C terminally truncated version that lacks the last 24 amino acids (constituting the domain that targets for GPI membrane anchoring) – the secreted alkaline phosphatase (SEAP). It presents certain characteristics like heat stability, substrate specificity, and resistance to chemical inactivation.
- Human-intestinal alkaline phosphatase. The human body has multiple types of alkaline phosphatase present, which are determined by a minimum of three gene loci. Each one of these three loci controls a different kind of alkaline phosphatase isozyme. However, the development of this enzyme can be strictly regulated by other factors such as thermostability, electrophoresis, inhibition, or immunology.

Human-intestinal alkaline phosphatase shows around 80% homology with the bovine intestinal enzyme which holds true their shared evolutionary origins. That same bovine enzyme has more than 70% homology with human placental enzyme. However, the human liver enzyme and the placental enzyme only share 20% homology despite their structural similarities.

In molecular cloning, alkaline phosphatase removes 5' phosphate groups from linearized plasmid DNA to prevent self-ligation. Removing the original 5′ phosphates also allows DNA ends to be radiolabeled.

Alkaline phosphatase can be assayed using p-nitrophenyl phosphate. Alkaline phosphatase dephosphorylates the non-specific substrate p-nitrophenyl phosphate to produce p-nitrophenol (PNP) and inorganic phosphate. PNP's yellow color with λ_{max} at 410 allows spectrophotometry to determine enzymatic activity.

Another important use of alkaline phosphatase is as a label for enzyme immunoassays due to the elevated catalytic activity of ALP enzyme.

Undifferentiated pluripotent stem cells have elevated levels of alkaline phosphatase on their cell membrane, therefore alkaline phosphatase staining is used to detect these cells and to test pluripotency (i.e., embryonic stem cells or embryonal carcinoma cells).

=== Drug-delivery ===
Since the 1960s intestinal alkaline phosphatase has been utilized in drug delivery. As it cleaves phosphate substructures from drugs, auxiliary agents, and even from the surface of nanocarriers, this enzyme enables the design of drug delivery systems that can alter their properties in the body on demand. The solubility of many drugs can be substantially improved by the design of phosphate prodrugs. On the intestinal mucosa the phosphate substructures are cleaved off by alkaline phosphatase and the drug is absorbed. Furthermore, anionic nanocarriers exhibiting bioinert properties can alter their surface to interactive once having reached the intestinal epithelium as due to an alkaline phosphatase triggered cleavage of anionic phosphate groups from their surface charge converts to cationic improving for instance cellular uptake.

=== Verification of milk pasteurization ===
Alkaline phosphatase is commonly used in the dairy industry as an indicator of successful pasteurization. This is because the most heat stable bacterium found in milk, Mycobacterium paratuberculosis, is destroyed by temperatures lower than those required to denature the enzyme. Therefore, its presence is ideal for indicating failed pasteurization.

Pasteurization verification is typically performed by measuring the fluorescence of a solution which becomes fluorescent when exposed to active alkaline phosphatase. Fluorimetry assays are required by milk producers in the UK to prove alkaline phosphatase has been denatured, as p-Nitrophenylphosphate tests are not considered accurate enough to meet health standards.

Alternatively the color change of p-nitrophenylphosphate as substrate in a buffered solution (Aschaffenburg Mullen Test) can be used. Raw milk would typically produce a yellow coloration within a couple of minutes, whereas properly pasteurised milk should show no change. There are exceptions to this, as in the case of heat-stable alkaline phosphatases produced by some bacteria, but these bacteria should not be present in milk.

In addition, the Scharer Rapid Phosphatase test investigates the presence and the absence of ALP enzymes in raw milk. This test is advantageous since a full and complete pasteurization inactivates the ALP enzymes, resulting in no color change. However, positive test results in changing the raw milk color into blue, thus indicating the presence of ALP enzymes. The test works by cleaving off a phosphate group from the substrate disodium phenyl phosphate, causing a release of phenol group and indicating positive test results observed visually and by spectrophotometer.

== See also ==
- Acid phosphatase
- Liver function tests
