= Inguinal orchiectomy =

Surgical procedure to remove a testicle

- Specialty: Urology

Inguinal orchiectomy (also named orchidectomy) is a specific method of orchiectomy whereby one or both testicles and the full spermatic cord are surgically removed through an incision in the lower lateral abdomen (the "inguinal region"). The procedure is generally performed by a urologist, typically if testicular cancer is suspected. Often it is performed as same-day surgery, with the patient returning home within hours of the procedure. Some patients elect to have a prosthetic testicle inserted into their scrotum. Depending on whether or not a prosthetic testicle is put in place of the original one, operating times run on average from three to six hours.

A 4–6 cm incision is made above the pubic bone on the side corresponding to the testicle to be removed. This incision runs obliquely midway between the pubic tubercle and the anterior superior iliac spine. The incision is extended down through the fat until the external oblique fascia is encountered. It is incised along its fibres and the spermatic cord is identified and isolated. From there, the testicle is pulled into the field through the inguinal canal. The spermatic cord is clamped off in two places and cut between the clamps. Long permanent sutures, usually silk or polypropylene, are left on the stump of the spermatic cord as a marker in case it needs to be removed in the future during a retroperitoneal lymph node dissection (RPLND).

The inguinal orchiectomy is a necessary procedure if testicular cancer is suspected. While it is possible to remove a testicle through an incision in the scrotum, this is not done when cancer is suspected because it disrupts the natural lymphatic drainage patterns. Testicular cancer usually spreads into the lymph nodes inside the abdomen in a predictable manner. Cutting the skin in the scrotum may disrupt this and cancer may spread to the inguinal lymph nodes, making surveillance and subsequent operations more difficult.

Complications from this procedure include bleeding and infection. The ilioinguinal nerve which runs anterior to the spermatic cord may be damaged during the operation and cause numbness over the inner thigh or chronic groin and scrotal pain. Other symptoms also include intermittent and chronic back pain and sudden loss of mobility in the lower back.

If the orchiectomy is performed to diagnose cancer, the testicle and spermatic cord are then sent to a pathologist to determine the makeup of the tumor, and the extent of spread within the testicle and cord. The pathology report, along with pre-surgical imaging studies and tumor markers, will determine the course of treatment.

== See also ==
- Index of oncology articles
