= Spermatocytic tumor =

Relatively benign tumour of the testis

- Other names: Spermatocytic tumour (ST)
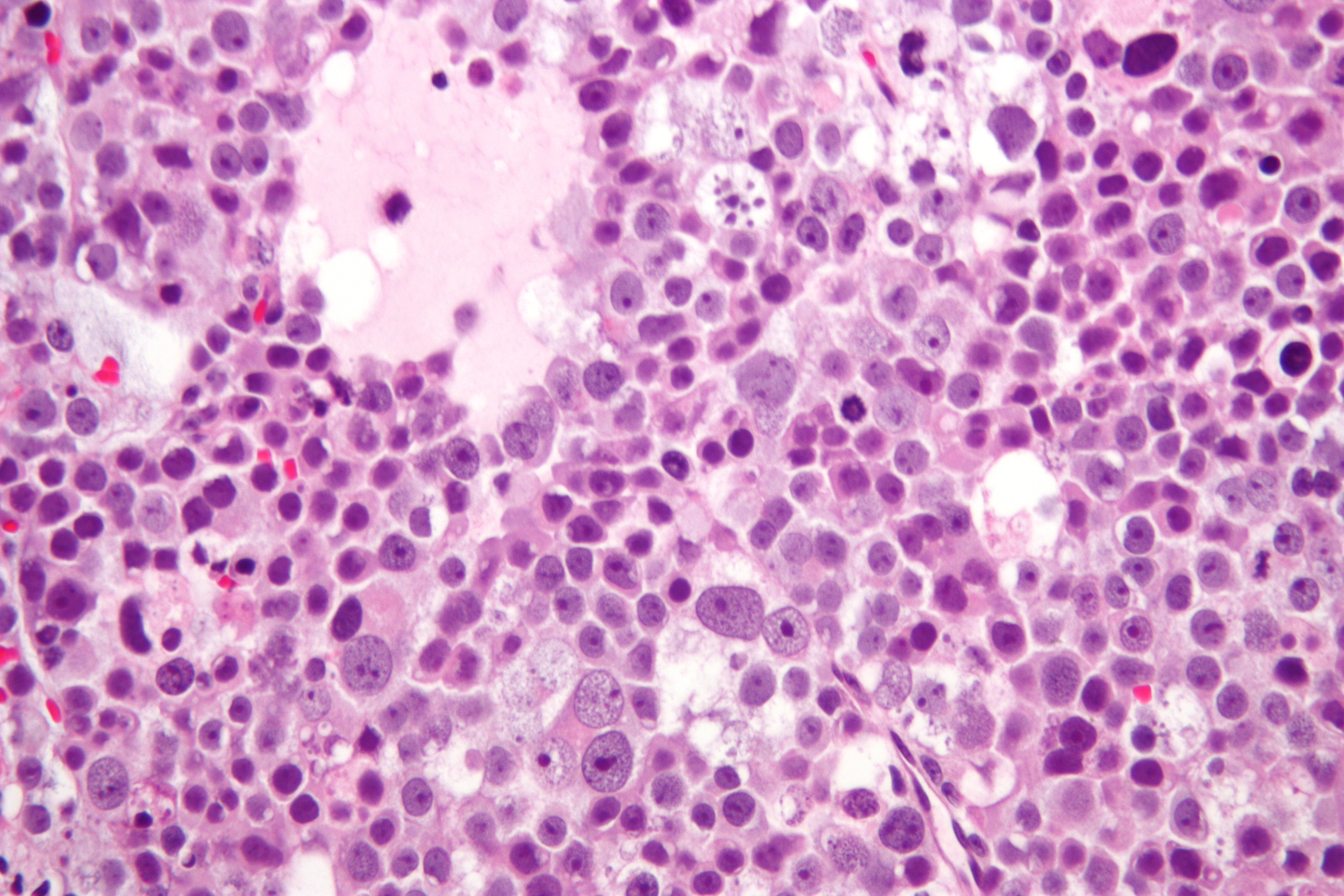
- Micrograph of a spermatocytic tumor. H&E stain.
- Specialty: Pathology, urology

Spermatocytic tumor, previously called spermatocytic seminoma, is a neoplasm of the testis (i.e. a tumour of the testis), and classified as a germ cell tumour.

The name of the tumour comes from the similarity (under the microscope) between the small cells of the tumour and secondary spermatocytes.

== Signs and symptoms ==
Spermatocytic tumor is a rare tumour, making up only one to two percent of all testicular germ cell tumours. Men presenting with this tumour are generally 50 to 60 years old, and its occurrence is rare in men under 30 years old. Most present with slow, painless testicular enlargement, which may involve both testes.

== Diagnosis ==
Spermatocytic tumors are diagnosed based on tissue from orchiectomy (or partial orchiectomy), done for a lesion suspicious for cancer on medical imaging.

The macroscopic appearance of the tumour is of a mutinodular grey-white to tan coloured mass with gelatinous, haemorrhagic and necrotic areas. The tumour may extend beyond the testis.

=== Histologic appearance ===
Histologically, spermatocytic tumors consist of three cell populations:

- small cells with a large nuclear-to-cytoplasmic ratio (6-8 μm),
- medium-sized cells with prominent nucleoli (15-18 μm) and,
- large cells (50-100 μm).

The cells are generally packed into nodules, and have a loose, sheet-like arrangement that is commonly interrupted by interstitial oedema. Unlike classical seminoma, fibrous septation and lymphocytic infiltrates are not seen. Cells undergoing mitosis are common, as are cells undergoing apoptosis.

Intratubular growth of spermatocytic tumor can be seen, however there is no intratubular germ cell neoplasia of unspecified type (IGCNU). The intratubular growth probably accounts for the appearance of separate tumour nodules within the testis.

Immunostaining for most of the usual testicular germ cell tumour markers is negative (i.e. placental alkaline phosphatase (PLAP), vimentin, actin, desmin, alpha fetoprotein (AFP), OCT4, human chorionic gonadotropin (hCG), and carcinoembryonic antigen (CEA)).

Rarely, spermatocytic tumors may show sarcomatoid differentiation, most commonly as undifferentiated spindled cells intermingled within the typical-appearing spermatocytic tumor cells. Rhabdomyosarcomatous differentiation has also been described.

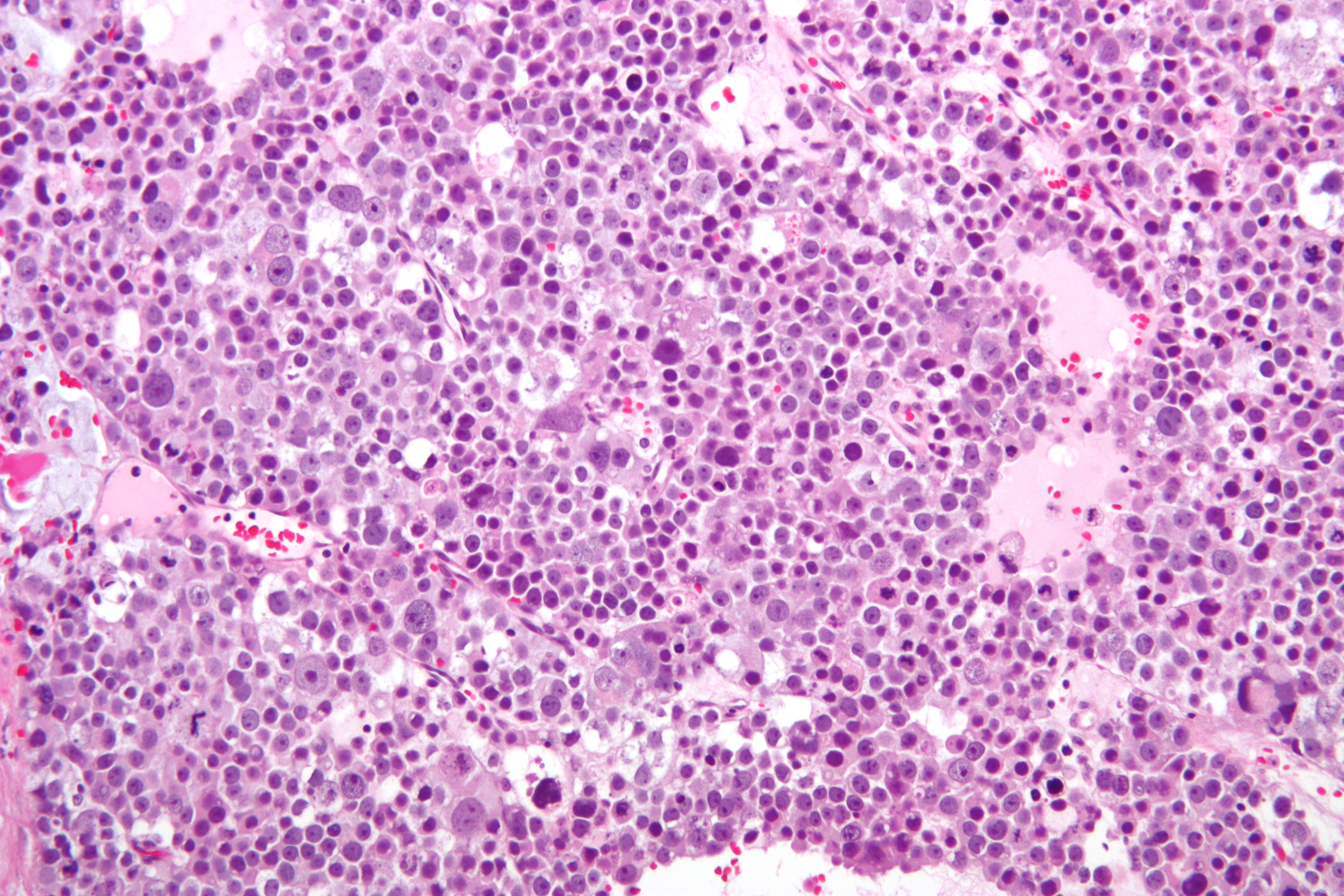
Micrograph of a spermatocytic tumor. H&E stain.

=== Relation to seminoma ===
Spermatocytic tumor is not considered a subtype of seminoma and, unlike seminoma and most other germ cell tumours, it does not arise from intratubular germ cell neoplasia. It has not been described as arising in locations outside the testis, and does not occur in association with other germ cell tumours.

== Treatment ==
Unlike classical seminoma, spermatocytic tumors rarely metastasise, so radical orchidectomy alone is sufficient treatment, and retroperitoneal lymph node dissection and adjuvant chemotherapy or radiotherapy are generally not required.
