= Alkaline phosphatase, placental type =

Protein found in humans

ALPP
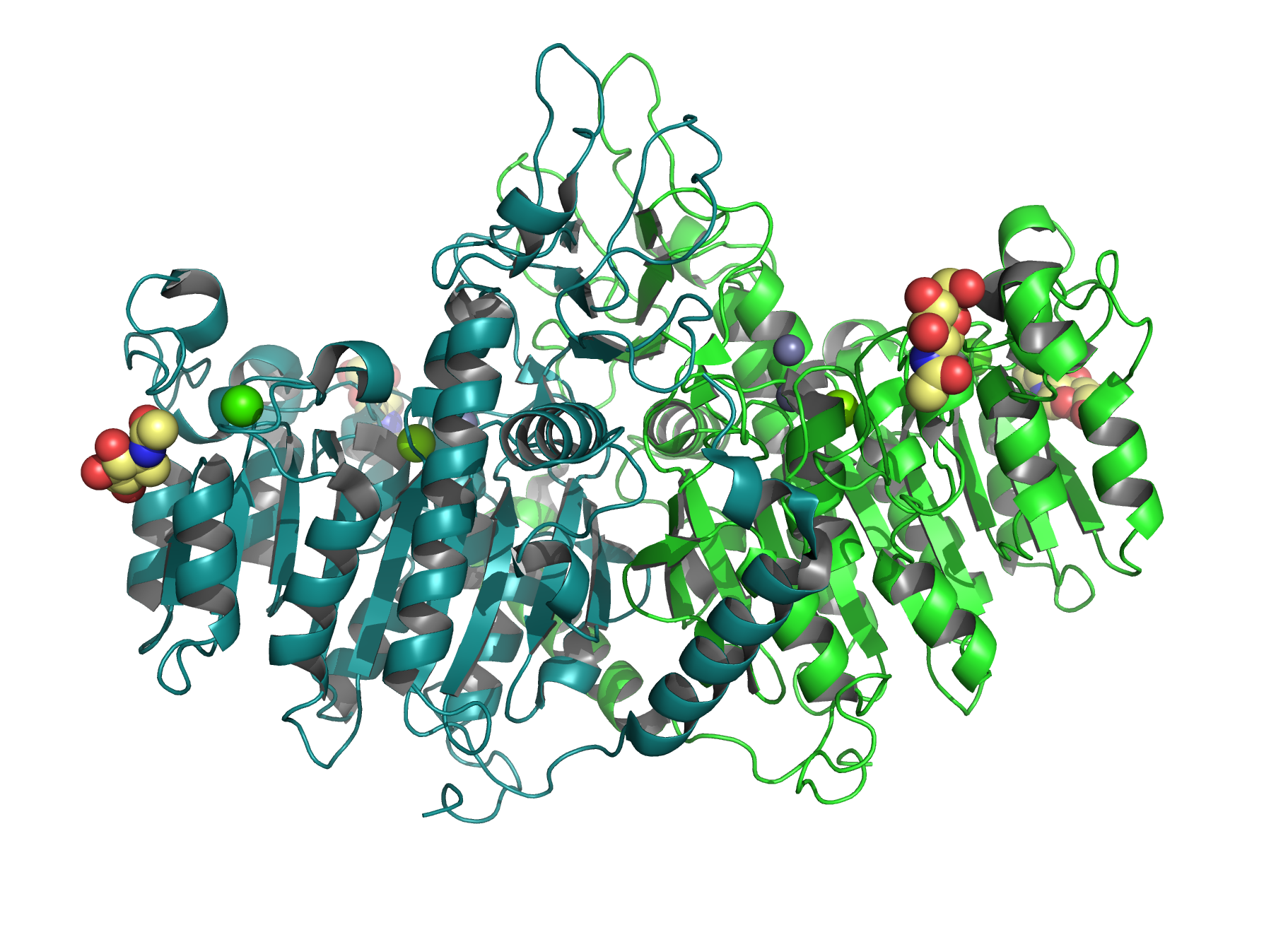

Identifiers
- Aliases: ALPP, ALP, PALP, PLAP, PLAP-1, alkaline phosphatase, placental, ALPI, IAP
- External IDs: OMIM: 171800; MGI: 1924018; GeneCards: ALPP
Available structures
PDB	Ortholog search: PDBe RCSB
PDB	List of PDB id codes 1EW2, 1ZEB, 1ZED, 1ZEF, 2GLQ, 3MK0, 3MK1, 3MK2
Enzyme activity
EC #	BRENDA	ExPASy	KEGG	MetaCyc
3.1.3.1	↗	↗	↗	↗

Gene location (Human)
Chr.	Chromosome 2 (human)
Band	2q37.1	Start	232,378,724 bp
Band	2q37.1	End	232,382,889 bp

Gene location (Mouse)
Chr.	Chromosome 1 (mouse)
Band	1|1 C5	Start	87,025,724 bp
Band	1|1 C5	End	87,029,328 bp
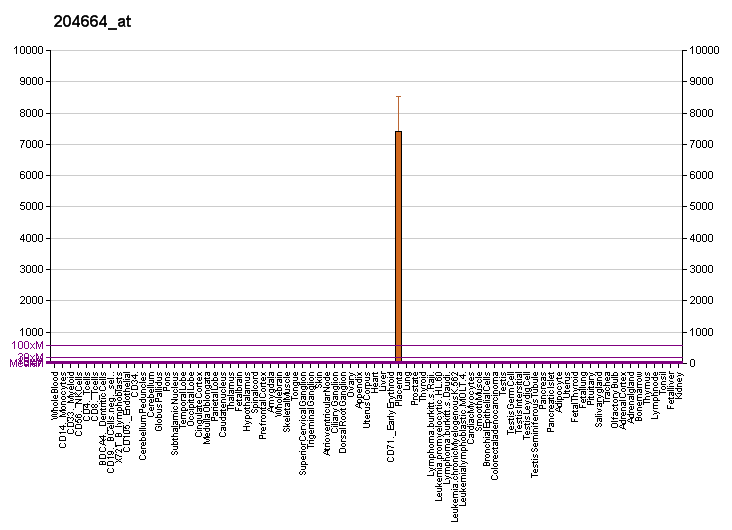

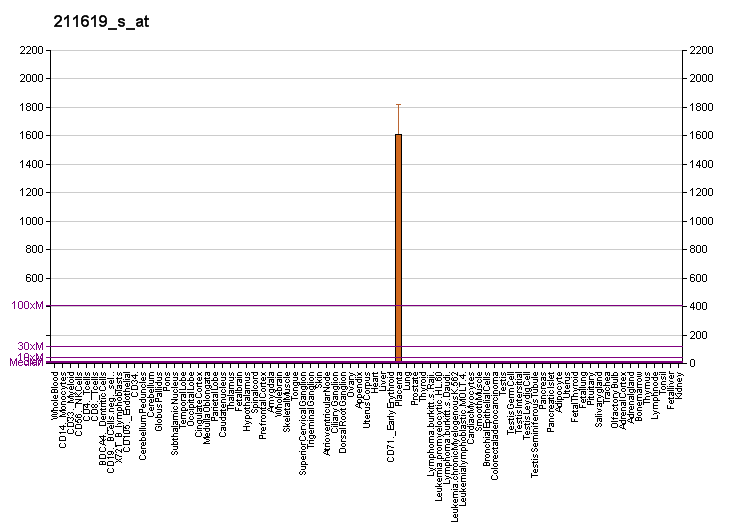

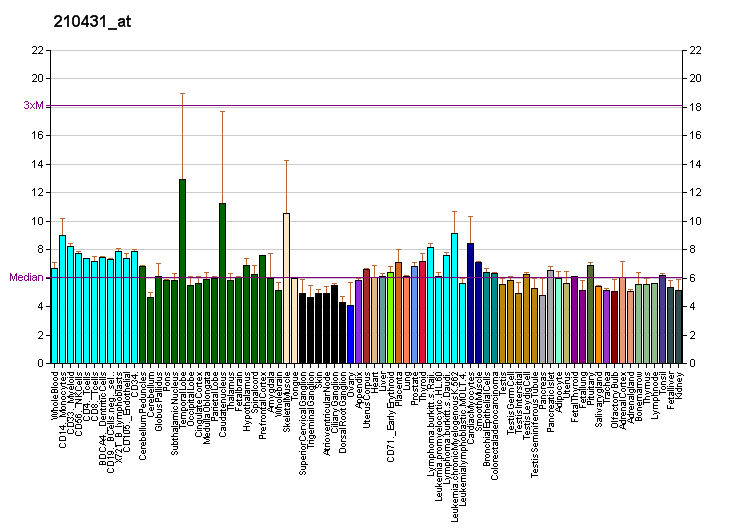
RNA expression pattern
Bgee	Human / Mouse (ortholog); Top expressed in: placenta; testicle; right uterine tube; upper lobe of left lung; right lung; lower lobe of lung; canal of the cervix; ectocervix; left ovary; muscle tissue / Top expressed in: duodenum; epithelium of small intestine; jejunum; ileum; migratory enteric neural crest cell; sexually immature organism; stomach; lumbar subsegment of spinal cord; large intestine; colon; More reference expression data
BioGPS	More reference expression data
Gene ontology
Molecular function	alkaline phosphatase activity; phosphatase activity; zinc ion binding; protein binding; hydrolase activity; catalytic activity; magnesium ion binding; metal ion binding
Cellular component	integral component of membrane; anchored component of membrane; cell surface; membrane; plasma membrane
Biological process	metabolism; dephosphorylation
Sources:Amigo / QuickGO
Orthologs
Databases	NCBI: entry; OMA: entry
Species	Human	Mouse
Entrez	250	76768
Ensembl	ENSG00000163283	ENSMUSG00000079440
UniProt	P05187	F8VPQ6
RefSeq (mRNA)	NM_001632	NM_001081082
RefSeq (protein)	NP_001623	NP_001074551
Location (UCSC)	Chr 2: 232.38 – 232.38 Mb	Chr 1: 87.03 – 87.03 Mb
PubMed search
- Wikidata
View/Edit Human	View/Edit Mouse

Alkaline phosphatase, placental type also known as placental alkaline phosphatase (PLAP) is an allosteric enzyme that in humans is encoded by the ALPP gene.

== Gene ==
There are at least four distinct but related alkaline phosphatases: intestinal (ALPI), placental (this enzyme), placental-like (ALPPL2), and liver/bone/kidney (ALPL) (tissue-nonspecific). The first three are located together on chromosome 2, whereas the tissue-nonspecific form is located on chromosome 1. The coding sequence for this form of alkaline phosphatase is unique in that the 3' untranslated region contains multiple copies of an Alu family repeat. In addition, this gene is polymorphic and three common alleles (type 1, type 2, and type 3) for this form of alkaline phosphatase have been well-characterized.

== Function ==
Alkaline phosphatase, placental type is a membrane-bound glycosylated dimeric enzyme, also referred to as the heat-stable form, that is expressed primarily in the placenta, although it is closely related to the intestinal form of the enzyme as well as to the placental-like form.

== Clinical significance ==
PLAP is a tumor marker, especially in seminoma and ovarian cancer (e.g., dysgerminoma). PLAP is reliable only in non-smokers, as smoking interferes with measurement of PLAP, since serum concentrations of PLAP are increased up to 10-fold in smokers and its measurement is therefore of little value in this group.
