= Alkaline phosphatase, germ cell =

Enzyme found in humans

ALPG

Identifiers
- Aliases: ALPG, GCAP, ALPPL2, alkaline phosphatase, placental like 2, alkaline phosphatase, germ cell, ALPPL
- External IDs: OMIM: 171810; MGI: 108009; GeneCards: ALPG
Enzyme activity
EC #	BRENDA	ExPASy	KEGG	MetaCyc
3.1.3.1	↗	↗	↗	↗

Gene location (Human)
Chr.	Chromosome 2 (human)
Band	2q37.1	Start	232,406,844 bp
Band	2q37.1	End	232,410,714 bp

Gene location (Mouse)
Chr.	Chromosome 1 (mouse)
Band	1 C5|1 44.05 cM	Start	87,014,416 bp
Band	1 C5|1 44.05 cM	End	87,017,650 bp
RNA expression pattern
Bgee	Human / Mouse (ortholog); Top expressed in: testicle; gonad; mucosa of colon; placenta; right uterine tube; mucosa of transverse colon; lower respiratory tract; lung; right lung; endometrium / Top expressed in: morula; morula; blastocyst; secondary oocyte; perirhinal cortex; entorhinal cortex; choroid plexus of fourth ventricle; primary oocyte; CA3 field; spermatid; More reference expression data
BioGPS	n/a
Gene ontology
Molecular function	phosphatase activity; catalytic activity; hydrolase activity; metal ion binding; alkaline phosphatase activity
Cellular component	anchored component of membrane; membrane; extracellular region; plasma membrane
Biological process	metabolism; dephosphorylation
Sources:Amigo / QuickGO
Orthologs
Databases	NCBI: entry; OMA: entry
Species	Human	Mouse
Entrez	251	11650
Ensembl	ENSG00000163286	ENSMUSG00000026246
UniProt	P10696	P24823
RefSeq (mRNA)	NM_031313	NM_007433
RefSeq (protein)	NP_112603	NP_031459
Location (UCSC)	Chr 2: 232.41 – 232.41 Mb	Chr 1: 87.01 – 87.02 Mb
PubMed search
- Wikidata
View/Edit Human	View/Edit Mouse

Alkaline phosphatase, germ cell is a enzyme that in humans is encoded by the gene ALPG (formerly ALPPL2).

== Function ==
There are at least four distinct but related alkaline phosphatases: intestinal, placental, placental-like, and liver/bone/kidney (tissue non-specific). The product of this gene is a membrane bound glycosylated enzyme, localized to testis, thymus and certain germ cell tumors, that is closely related to both the placental and intestinal forms of alkaline phosphatase.
