= ALPI =

Protein-coding gene in humans

Identifiers
- Aliases: ALPI, IAP, alkaline phosphatase, intestinal
- External IDs: OMIM: 171740; MGI: 87984; GeneCards: ALPI
Enzyme activity
EC #	BRENDA	ExPASy	KEGG	MetaCyc
3.1.3.1	↗	↗	↗	↗

Gene location (Human)
Chr.	Chromosome 2 (human)
Band	2q37.1	Start	232,456,125 bp
Band	2q37.1	End	232,460,753 bp

Gene location (Mouse)
Chr.	Chromosome 1 (mouse)
Band	1 C5|1 44.06 cM	Start	87,052,695 bp
Band	1 C5|1 44.06 cM	End	87,055,634 bp
RNA expression pattern
Bgee	Human / Mouse (ortholog); Top expressed in: jejunal mucosa; duodenum; mucosa of ileum; mucosa of transverse colon; rectum; human kidney; muscle tissue; smooth muscle tissue; appendix; gallbladder / Top expressed in: duodenum; embryo; jejunum; temporal muscle; upper arm; secretory cell; colon; triceps brachii muscle; mucous cell of stomach; midbrain tectum; More reference expression data
BioGPS	n/a
Gene ontology
Molecular function	protease binding; phosphatase activity; zinc ion binding; protein binding; catalytic activity; hydrolase activity; magnesium ion binding; metal ion binding; alkaline phosphatase activity
Cellular component	integral component of membrane; anchored component of membrane; membrane; extracellular region; plasma membrane
Biological process	metabolism; dephosphorylation; phosphatidic acid biosynthetic process; digestion
Sources:Amigo / QuickGO
Orthologs
Databases	NCBI: entry; OMA: entry
Species	Human	Mouse
Entrez	248	11648
Ensembl	ENSG00000163295	ENSMUSG00000036500
UniProt	P09923	P24822
RefSeq (mRNA)	NM_001631	NM_007432
RefSeq (protein)	NP_001622	n/a
Location (UCSC)	Chr 2: 232.46 – 232.46 Mb	Chr 1: 87.05 – 87.06 Mb
PubMed search
- Wikidata
View/Edit Human	View/Edit Mouse

Alkaline phosphatase, intestinal, also known as ALPI, is a type of alkaline phosphatase that in humans is encoded by the ALPI gene. Its chemical formula is:C_{2679}H_{4196}O_{965}N_{672}S_{18}P_{2}.

Intestinal alkaline phosphatase is an endogenous enzyme that maintains gut homeostasis. It detoxifyies bacterial toxins, dephosphorylates phosphorylated nucleotides, regulates lipid absorption in the intestine, and regulates the microbiome in the intestine. In addition to these functions, intestinal alkaline phosphatase can also modulate bicarbonate secretion and can modulate the pH of the duodenum.
