= Pagetoid =

Upward spreading of abnormal cells in the epidermis

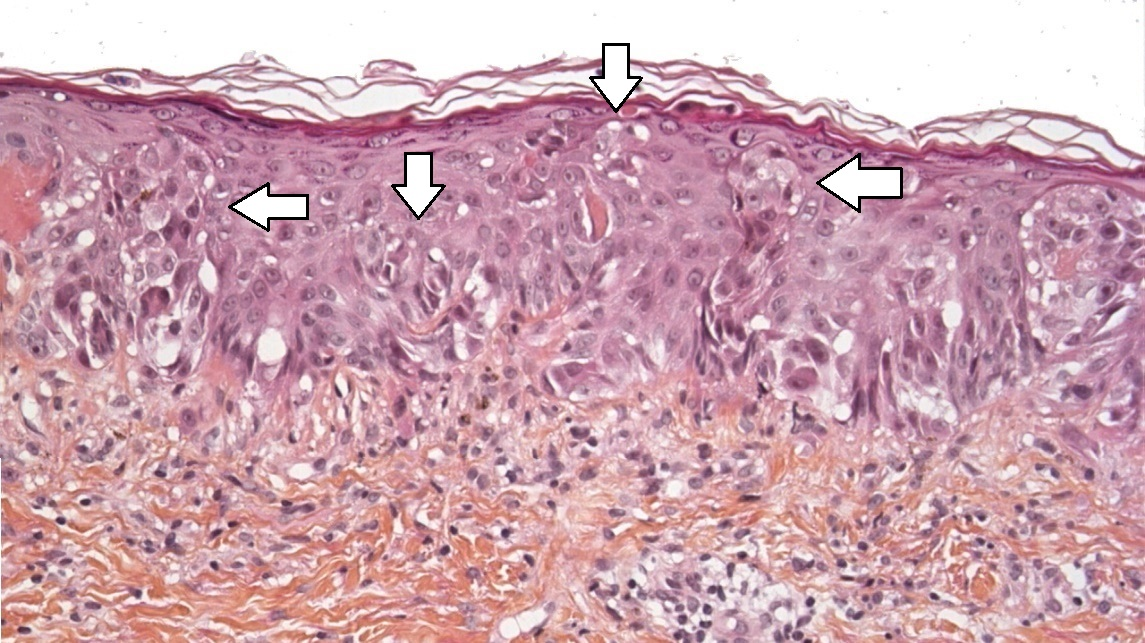
Spitz nevus with pagetoid spread (some of pagetoid nests annotated by white arrows).

Pagetoid is a term used in dermatology to refer to "upward spreading" of abnormal cells in the epidermis (i.e., from bottom to top). It is uncommon and a possible indication of a precancerous or cancerous condition. Cells display pagetoid growth when they invade the upper epidermis from below. Squamous cell carcinoma, melanoma in situ, Pagetoid Bowen's disease, ocular sebaceous carcinoma, and other carcinomas can all display pagetoid growth.

The term pagetoid (i.e., 'Paget-like') is derived from the extramammary Paget's disease, wherein the large tumour cells are arranged singly or in small clusters within the epidermis and its appendages. These cells are distinguished by a clear halo from the surrounding epithelial cells and a finely granular cytoplasm. This proliferation of cells in the epidermis is responsible for the "buckshot scatter" pattern. This is a typical feature of superficial spreading type of melanoma.

== Diagnosis and clinical significance ==
The presence of pagetoid spread in biopsy samples often indicates a serious underlying pathology. Dermatopathologists use histological examination and immunohistochemistry to confirm the diagnosis. Early detection is crucial, as conditions associated with pagetoid spread can be aggressive if left untreated.

== Medical relevance ==
Pagetoid spread is observed in various medical conditions, including Paget's disease of the breast, extramammary Paget’s disease, vulvar Paget’s disease, melanoma in situ (Pagetoid melanoma), actinic keratosis and Bowen’s disease.

== Paget's disease of the breast ==
A rare type of breast cancer where malignant cells extend from the ducts into the nipple skin, often presenting with redness, scaling, or crusting of the nipple and surrounding areola. It may be associated with an underlying ductal carcinoma in situ or invasive breast cancer.

Diagnosis is confirmed through biopsy, often using immunohistochemical markers such as CK7, HER2, and GCDFP-15 to distinguish Paget’s cells. Treatment options include:

- Surgical excision: mastectomy or breast-conserving surgery depending on the extent of disease and underlying carcinoma.
- Radiotherapy: applied post-surgery in cases of breast-conserving treatment.
- Systemic therapy: hormone therapy or targeted therapy for HER2-positive cases.
- Follow-up: essential for monitoring recurrence or underlying carcinoma.

== Extramammary Paget’s disease ==
A rare intraepithelial adenocarcinoma affecting areas such as the vulva, perianal region, and axilla. Extramammary Paget’s disease commonly presents as a chronic, erythematous, eczematous patch that may be mistaken for dermatitis or fungal infections. It may be associated with an underlying malignancy in some cases.

Diagnosis is based on histopathology and immunohistochemical staining (CK7, CEA, and HER2). Treatment options include:

- Surgical excision: wide local excision or Mohs micrographic surgery to ensure complete removal.
- Topical therapies: imiquimod or 5-fluorouracil for superficial cases.
- Radiotherapy: considered for non-surgical candidates.
- Targeted therapy: anti-HER2 therapies may be used in advanced cases.
- Follow-up: due to high recurrence rates, regular monitoring is required.

== Vulvar Paget’s disease ==
A subset of extramammary Paget’s disease affecting the vulvar region, often presenting as erythematous, pruritic, or ulcerated lesions. Patients may experience chronic discomfort, burning sensations, or irritation. Histopathologically, vulvar Paget’s disease is characterized by large, pale-staining pagetoid cells infiltrating the epidermis.

Diagnosis is confirmed through biopsy and immunohistochemical staining, commonly using markers such as CK7, GCDFP-15, and HER2. Treatment options include:

- Surgical excision: wide local excision or Mohs micrographic surgery to ensure complete removal.
- Topical therapies: imiquimod and 5-fluorouracil may be used for non-invasive or recurrent cases.
- Radiotherapy: considered for patients who are not surgical candidates.
- Follow-up: due to the high recurrence rate, long-term monitoring is essential.

== Melanoma in situ (Pagetoid melanoma) ==
A variant of melanoma where melanocytes spread in an upward direction within the epidermis. This pattern is most commonly seen in superficial spreading melanoma and acral lentiginous melanoma. Clinically, it appears as an irregularly pigmented lesion with asymmetrical borders, often requiring histopathological examination for diagnosis.

Diagnosis is confirmed through dermoscopic examination and histopathology, using markers such as S100, HMB-45, and Melan-A. Treatment options include:

- Surgical excision: wide excision with margin control.
- Sentinel lymph node biopsy: performed in invasive cases to assess metastasis.
- Immunotherapy: advanced cases may require checkpoint inhibitors (e.g., PD-1 inhibitors).
- Follow-up: regular skin checks for recurrence or new melanoma lesions.

== Actinic keratosis and Bowen’s disease ==
Actinic Keratosis and Bowen’s Disease – Precancerous or early-stage squamous cell carcinoma conditions where pagetoid spread may be observed. Actinic keratosis is caused by chronic sun exposure and appears as rough, scaly patches on sun-exposed areas. Bowen’s disease, also known as squamous cell carcinoma in situ, presents as a persistent, scaly, erythematous plaque and carries a risk of progression to invasive squamous cell carcinoma.

Diagnosis relies on clinical and histopathological evaluation, with markers such as p53 and Ki-67 aiding differentiation. Treatment options include:

- Topical therapies: Imiquimod, 5-fluorouracil, or diclofenac for superficial lesions.
- Cryotherapy: effective for isolated actinic keratoses.
- Surgical excision: indicated for larger or suspicious lesions.
- Photodynamic therapy: utilized for multiple lesions or field cancerization.
- Follow-up: regular skin monitoring due to risk of malignant transformation.
