= Tumor marker =

Proxy markers for certain cancers

A tumor marker is a biomarker that can be used to indicate the presence of cancer or the behavior of cancers (measure progression or response to therapy). They can be found in bodily fluids or tissue. Markers can help with assessing prognosis, surveilling patients after surgical removal of tumors, and even predicting drug-response and monitor therapy.

Tumor markers can be molecules that are produced in higher amounts by cancer cells than normal cells, but can also be produced by other cells from a reaction with the cancer.

The markers can't be used to give patients a diagnosis but can be compared with the result of other tests like biopsy or imaging.

== Classification ==
Tumor markers can be proteins, carbohydrates, receptors and gene products. Proteins include hormones and enzymes. To detect enzyme tumor markers enzyme activity is measured. They were previously widely used, but they have largely been replaced by oncofetal antigens and monoclonal antibodies, due to disadvantages such as most of them lacking organ specificity. Carbohydrates consist of antigens on and/or secreted from tumor cells, these are either high-molecular weight mucins or blood group antigens. Receptors are used to determine prognosis and measure how the patient responds to treatment, while genes or gene products can be analyzed to identify mutations in the genome or altered gene expression.

== Uses ==
Tumor markers may be used for the following purposes:

- Monitoring the malignancy: When a malignant tumor is found by the presence of a tumor marker, the level of marker found in the body can be monitored to determine the state of the tumor and how it responds to treatment. If the quantity stays the same during treatment it can indicate that the treatment isn't working, and an alternative treatment should be considered. Rising levels of tumor marker does not necessarily reflect a growing malignancy but can result from things like unrelated illnesses.
- Reflect the stage of cancer: By determining the stage of cancer, it's possible to give a prognosis and treatment plan.
- Screening for cancers: No screening test is wholly specific, and a high level of tumor marker can still be found in benign tumors. One tumor marker used in screening is PSA (prostate-specific antigen).
- Diagnostics: Tumor markers alone can't be used for diagnostic purposes, due to lack of sensitivity and specificity. The only approved diagnostic method for cancer is with a biopsy.
- Detects reoccurring cancers: Tumor markers can detect reoccurring cancers in patients post-treatment.

== Techniques ==
Tumor markers can be determined in serum or rarely in urine or other body fluids, often by immunoassay, but other techniques such as enzyme activity determination are sometimes used. Assaying tumor markers were significantly improved after the creation of ELISA and RIA techniques and the advancement of monoclonal antibodies in the 1960s and 1970s.

For many assays, different assay techniques are available. It is important that the same assay is used, as the results from different assays are generally not comparable. For example, mutations of the p53 gene can be detected through immunohistochemical polymorphism screening of DNA, sequence analysis of DNA, or by single-strand conformational polymorphism screening of DNA. Each assay may give different results of the clinical value of the p53 mutations as a prognostic factor.

Interlaboratory proficiency testing for tumor marker tests, and for clinical tests more generally, is routine in Europe and an emerging field in the United States. New York state is prominent in advocating such research.

== List of commonly used markers ==
Tumor marker	Associated tumor types
Alpha fetoprotein (AFP)	germ cell tumor, hepatocellular carcinoma
CA15-3	breast cancer
CA 27.29	breast cancer
CA19-9	Mainly pancreatic cancer, but also colorectal cancer and other types of gastrointestinal cancer.
CA-125	Mainly ovarian cancer, but may also be elevated in for example endometrial cancer, fallopian tube cancer, lung cancer, breast cancer and gastrointestinal cancer.
Calcitonin	medullary thyroid carcinoma
Calretinin	mesothelioma, sex cord-gonadal stromal tumor, adrenocortical carcinoma, synovial sarcoma
Carcinoembryonic antigen (CEA)	gastrointestinal cancer, cervical cancer, lung cancer, ovarian cancer, breast cancer, urinary tract cancer
CD34	hemangiopericytoma/solitary fibrous tumor, pleomorphic lipoma, gastrointestinal stromal tumor, dermatofibrosarcoma protuberans
CD99	Ewing sarcoma, primitive neuroectodermal tumor, hemangiopericytoma/solitary fibrous tumor, synovial sarcoma, lymphoma, leukemia, sex cord-gonadal stromal tumor
CD117	gastrointestinal stromal tumor, mastocytosis, seminoma
Chromogranin	neuroendocrine tumor
Chromosomes 3, 7, 17, and 9p21	bladder cancer
Cytokeratin	Many types of carcinoma, some types of sarcoma
Desmin	smooth muscle sarcoma, skeletal muscle sarcoma, endometrial stromal sarcoma
Epithelial membrane antigen (EMA)	many types of carcinoma, meningioma, some types of sarcoma
Factor VIII; CD31, FL1, CD34	vascular sarcoma
Glial fibrillary acidic protein (GFAP)	glioma (astrocytoma, ependymoma)
Gross cystic disease fluid protein (GCDFP-15)	breast cancer, ovarian cancer, salivary gland cancer
HMB-45	melanoma, PEComa (for example angiomyolipoma), clear cell carcinoma, adrenocortical carcinoma
Human chorionic gonadotropin (hCG)	gestational trophoblastic disease, germ cell tumor, choriocarcinoma
immunoglobulin	lymphoma, leukemia
inhibin	sex cord-gonadal stromal tumor, adrenocortical carcinoma, hemangioblastoma
keratin (various types)	carcinoma, some types of sarcoma
lymphocyte marker (various types)	lymphoma, leukemia
MART-1 (Melan-A)	melanoma, steroid-producing tumors (adrenocortical carcinoma, gonadal tumor)
Myo D1	rhabdomyosarcoma, small-blue-round-cell tumor
muscle-specific actin (MSA)	myosarcoma (leiomyosarcoma, rhabdomyosarcoma)
neurofilament	neuroendocrine tumor; small-cell carcinoma of the lung
neuron-specific enolase (NSE)	neuroendocrine tumor; small-cell carcinoma of the lung, breast cancer
placental alkaline phosphatase (PLAP)	seminoma, dysgerminoma, embryonal carcinoma
prostate-specific antigen (PSA)	prostate
S100 protein	melanoma, sarcoma (neurosarcoma, lipoma, chondrosarcoma), astrocytoma, gastrointestinal stromal tumor, salivary gland cancer, some types of adenocarcinoma, histiocytic tumor (dendritic cell, macrophage)
smooth muscle actin (SMA)	gastrointestinal stromal tumor, leiomyosarcoma, PEComa
synaptophysin	neuroendocrine tumor
thymidine kinase	lymphoma, leukemia, lung cancer, prostate cancer
thyroglobulin (Tg)	post-operative marker of thyroid cancer (but not in medullary thyroid cancer)
thyroid transcription factor-1 (TTF-1)	all types of thyroid cancer, lung cancer
Tumor M2-PK	colorectal cancer, Breast cancer, renal cell carcinoma lung cancer, pancreatic cancer, esophageal cancer, stomach cancer,cervical cancer, ovarian cancer,
vimentin	sarcoma, renal cell carcinoma, endometrial cancer, lung carcinoma, lymphoma, leukemia, melanoma

== Accuracy and specific use ==
The ideal tumor marker has the following characteristics:

- Specificity to a certain type of tumor
- Should detect the malignancy earlier than a clinical diagnosis
- Be highly sensitive to avoid false positives
- The level of tumor marker should indicate the state of the malignancy to be able to monitor treatment response.

An ideal tumor marker does not exist, and how they are clinically applied depends on the specific tumor marker. For example, tumor markers like Ki-67 can be used to choose form of treatment or in prognostics but are not useful to give a diagnosis, while other tumor markers have the opposite functionality. Therefore it's important to follow the guidelines of the specific tumor marker.

Tumor markers are mainly used in clinical medicine to support a diagnosis and monitor the state of malignancy or reocurrence of cancer.

== See also ==
- Tumor antigen
- List of cancer types
- Cancer biomarker
