= Seminoma =

Malignant tumor of the testicle

- Other names: Pure seminoma, classical seminoma
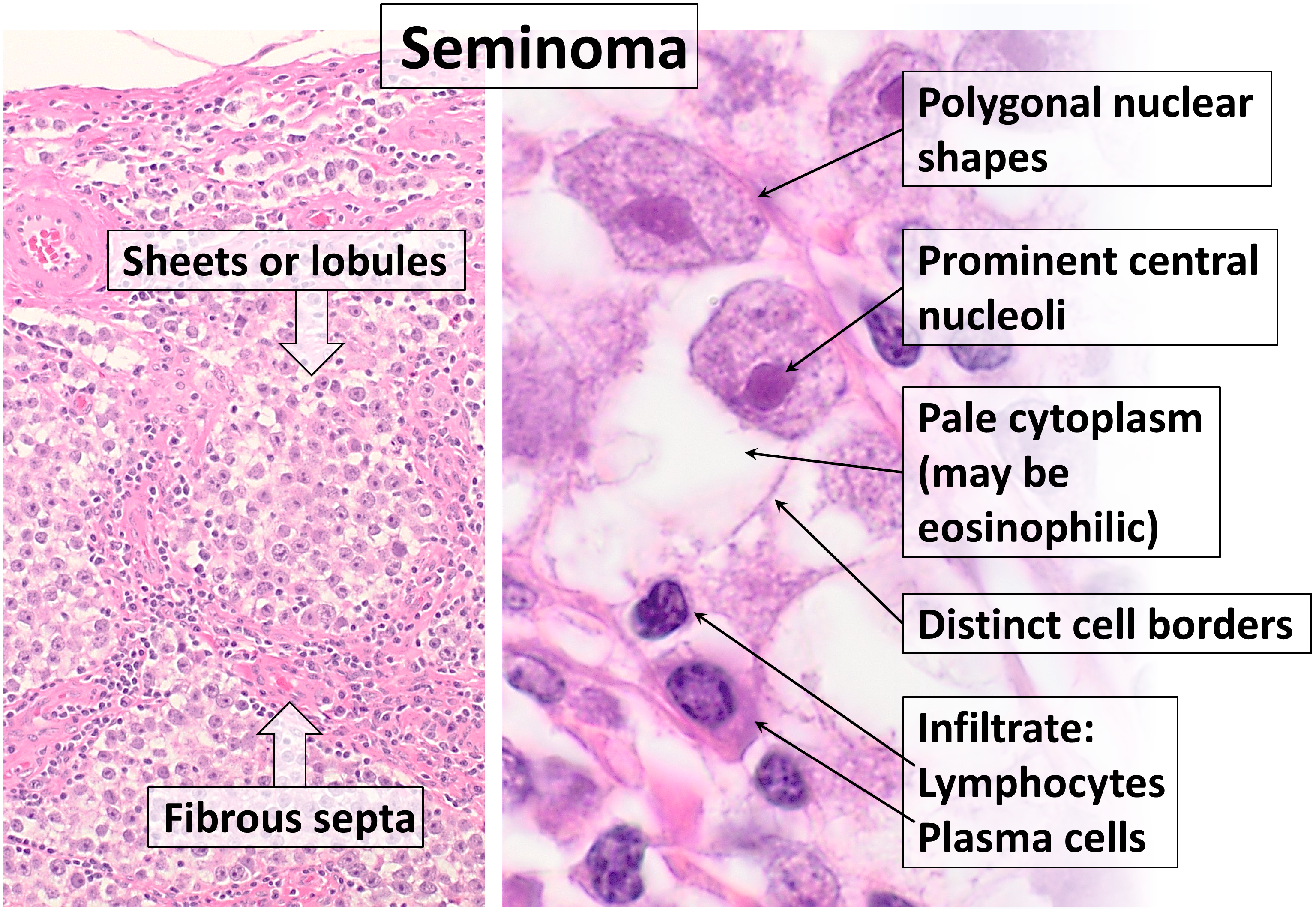
- Histopathology of classical seminoma, with typical features.
- Specialty: Urology, oncology

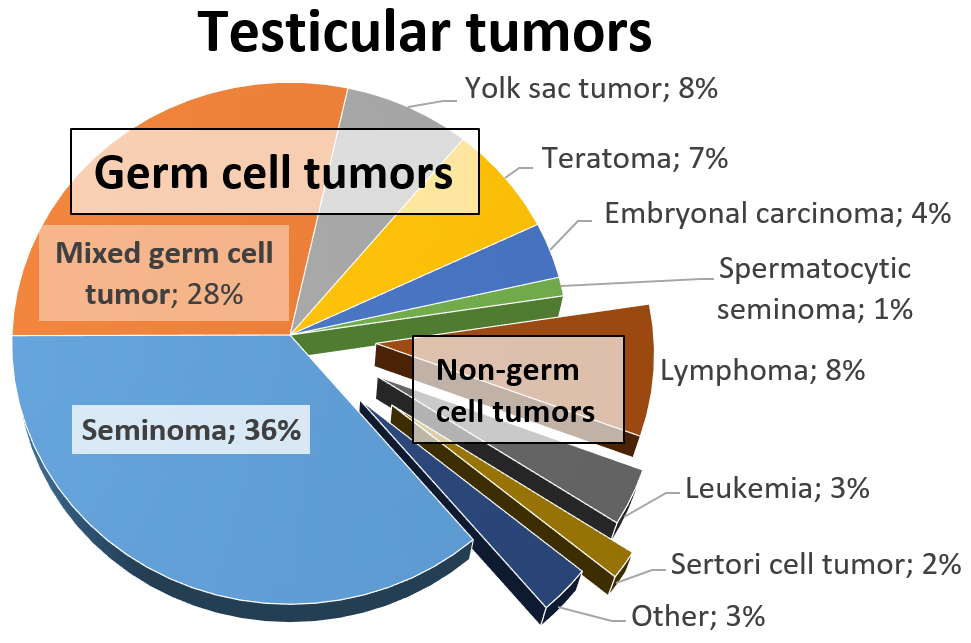
Relative incidences of testicular tumors, showing seminoma at bottom left.

A seminoma is a germ cell tumor of the testicle or, more rarely, the mediastinum or other extra-gonadal locations. It is a malignant neoplasm and is one of the most treatable and curable cancers, with a survival rate above 95% if discovered in early stages.

Testicular seminoma originates in the germinal epithelium of the seminiferous tubules. About half of germ cell tumors of the testicles are seminomas. Treatment usually requires removal of one testicle. However, fertility is not usually affected. All other sexual functions will remain intact.

== Signs and symptoms ==
The average age of diagnosis is between 35 and 50 years. This is about 5 to 10 years older than men with other germ cell tumors of the testes. In most cases, they produce masses that are readily felt on testicular self-examination; however, in up to 11 percent of cases, there may be no mass able to be felt, or there may be testicular atrophy. Testicular pain is reported in up to one fifth of cases. Low back pain may occur after metastasis to the retroperitoneum.

Some cases of seminoma can present as a primary tumour outside the testis, most commonly in the mediastinum. In the ovary, the tumor is called a dysgerminoma, and in non-gonadal sites, particularly the central nervous system, it is called a germinoma.

== Prognosis ==
Non pulmonary visceral metastases and high LDH levels are associated with worse prognosis.

== Diagnosis ==
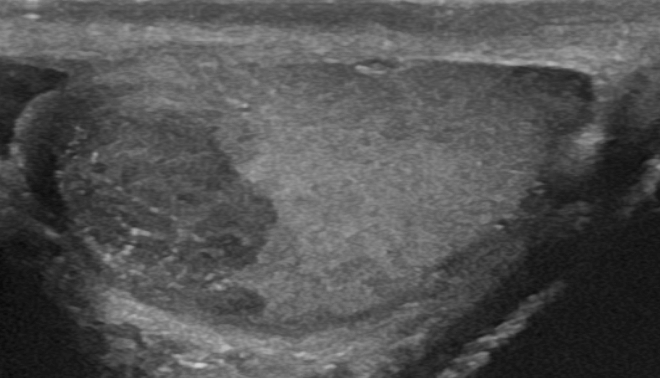
Ultrasound image of a seminoma

Blood tests may detect the presence of placental alkaline phosphatase (ALP, ALKP, ALPase, Alk Phos) in fifty percent of cases. However, Alk Phos cannot usefully stand alone as a marker for seminoma and contributes little to follow-up, due to its rise with smoking. Human chorionic gonadotropin (hCG) may be elevated in some cases, but this correlates more to the presence of trophoblast cells within the tumour than to the stage of the tumour. A classical or pure seminoma by definition does not cause an elevated serum alpha fetoprotein. Lactate dehydrogenase (LDH) may be the only marker that is elevated in some seminomas. The degree of elevation in the serum LDH has prognostic value in advanced seminoma.

The cut surface of the tumour is fleshy and lobulated, and varies in colour from cream to tan to pink. The tumour tends to bulge from the cut surface, and small areas of hemorrhage may be seen. These areas of hemorrhage usually correspond to trophoblastic cell clusters within the tumour.

Microscopic examination shows that seminomas are usually composed of either a sheet-like or lobular pattern of cells with a fibrous stromal network. The fibrous septa almost always contain focal lymphocyte inclusions, and granulomas are sometimes seen. The tumour cells themselves typically have abundant clear to pale pink cytoplasm containing abundant glycogen, which is demonstrable with a periodic acid-Schiff (PAS) stain. The nuclei are prominent and usually contain one or two large nucleoli, and have prominent nuclear membranes. Foci of syncytiotrophoblastic cells may be present in varied amounts. The adjacent testicular tissue commonly shows intratubular germ cell neoplasia, and may also show variable spermatocytic maturation arrest. Cytomorphology smear showing discohesive large cells, round nucleus, prominent nucleoli and moderate amount of cytoplasm along with small, mature lymphocytes in the tigroid background. Positive IHC (Immunohistochemistry) stains include OCT 3/4, CD117, D2-40, PLAP, SALL4, SOX17 and PAS. Molecular study suggest KIT mutation.

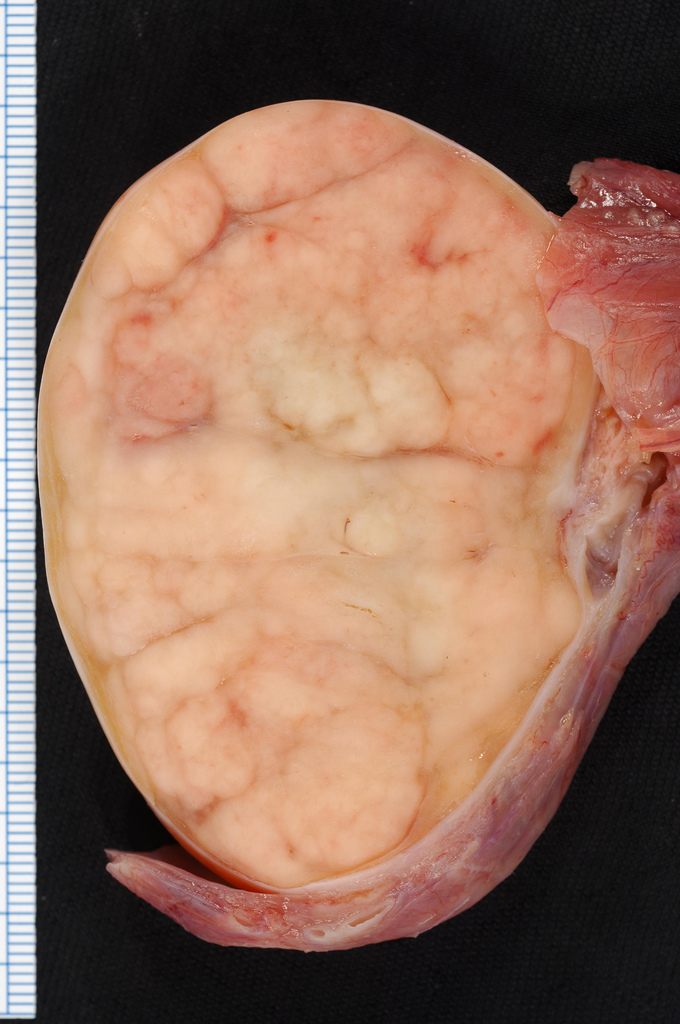
Gross pathology of seminoma

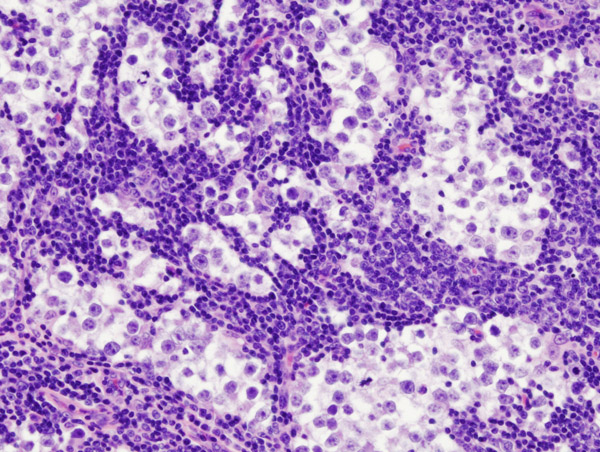
Histopathological image of metastatic seminoma in the inguinal lymph node. Hematoxylin & eosin stain.

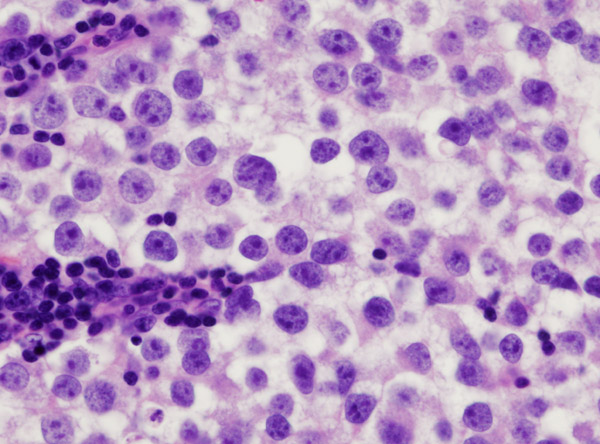
Histopathological image of metastatic seminoma in the inguinal lymph node. At higher magnification. Hematoxylin & eosin stain.

Micrograph (high magnification) of a seminoma. H&E stain.

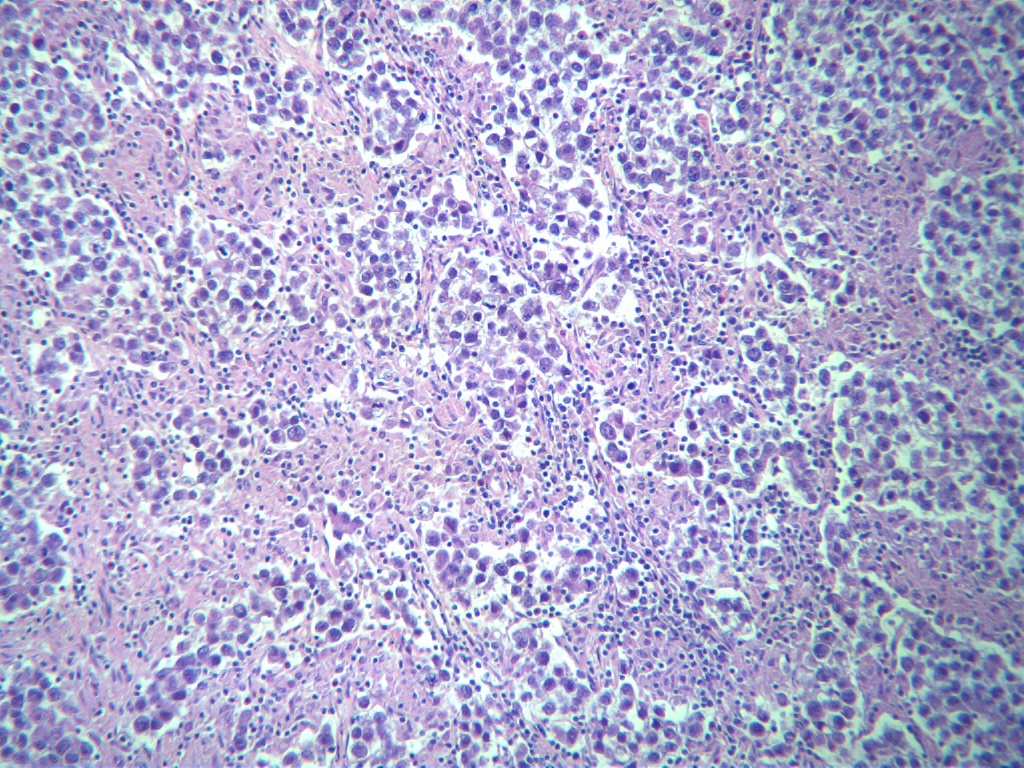
Testicular seminoma, showing a typically prominent lymphocytic infiltrate in the fibrous stroma separating the clusters of tumor cells.

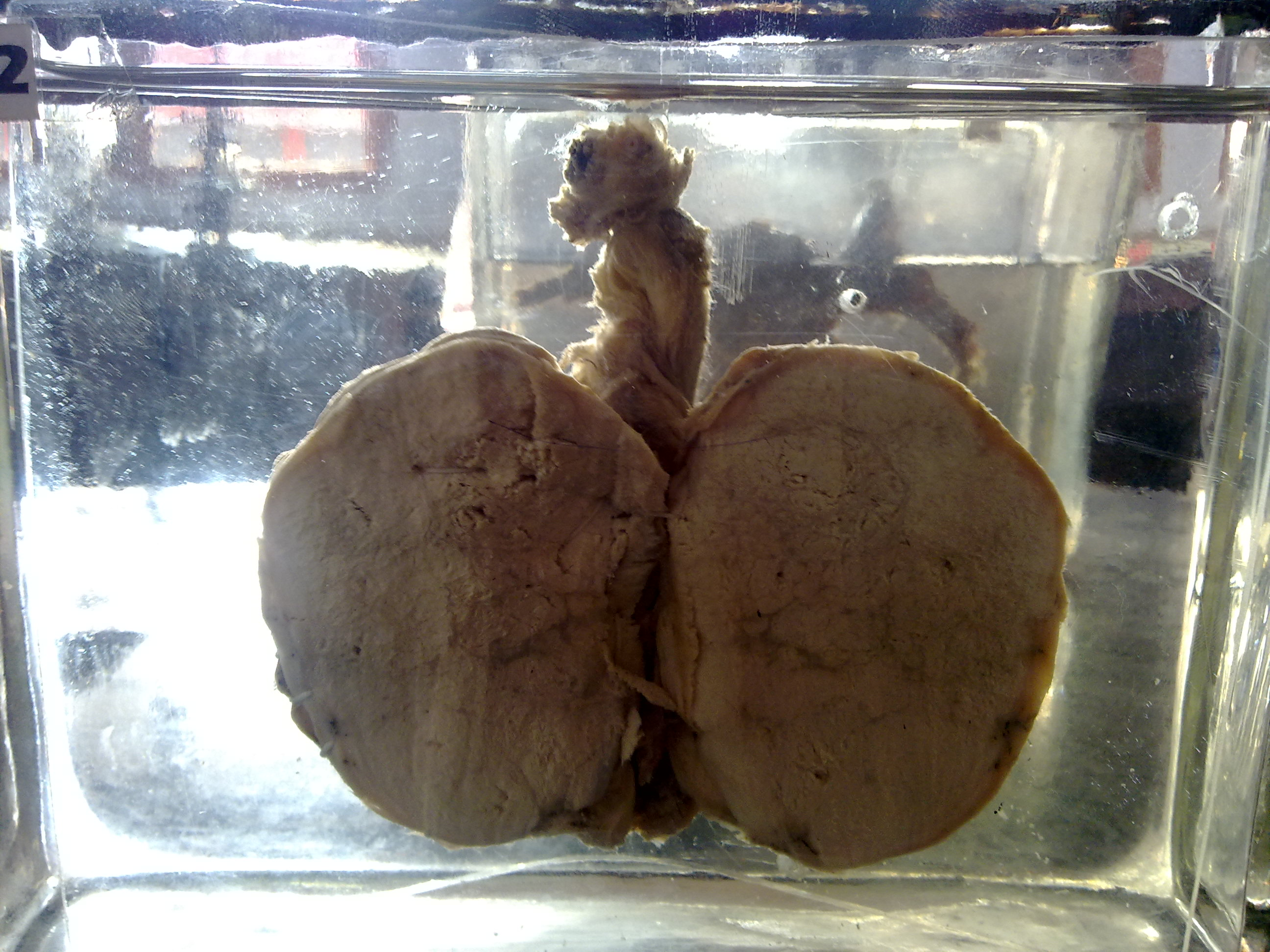
Orchidectomy specimen showing seminoma

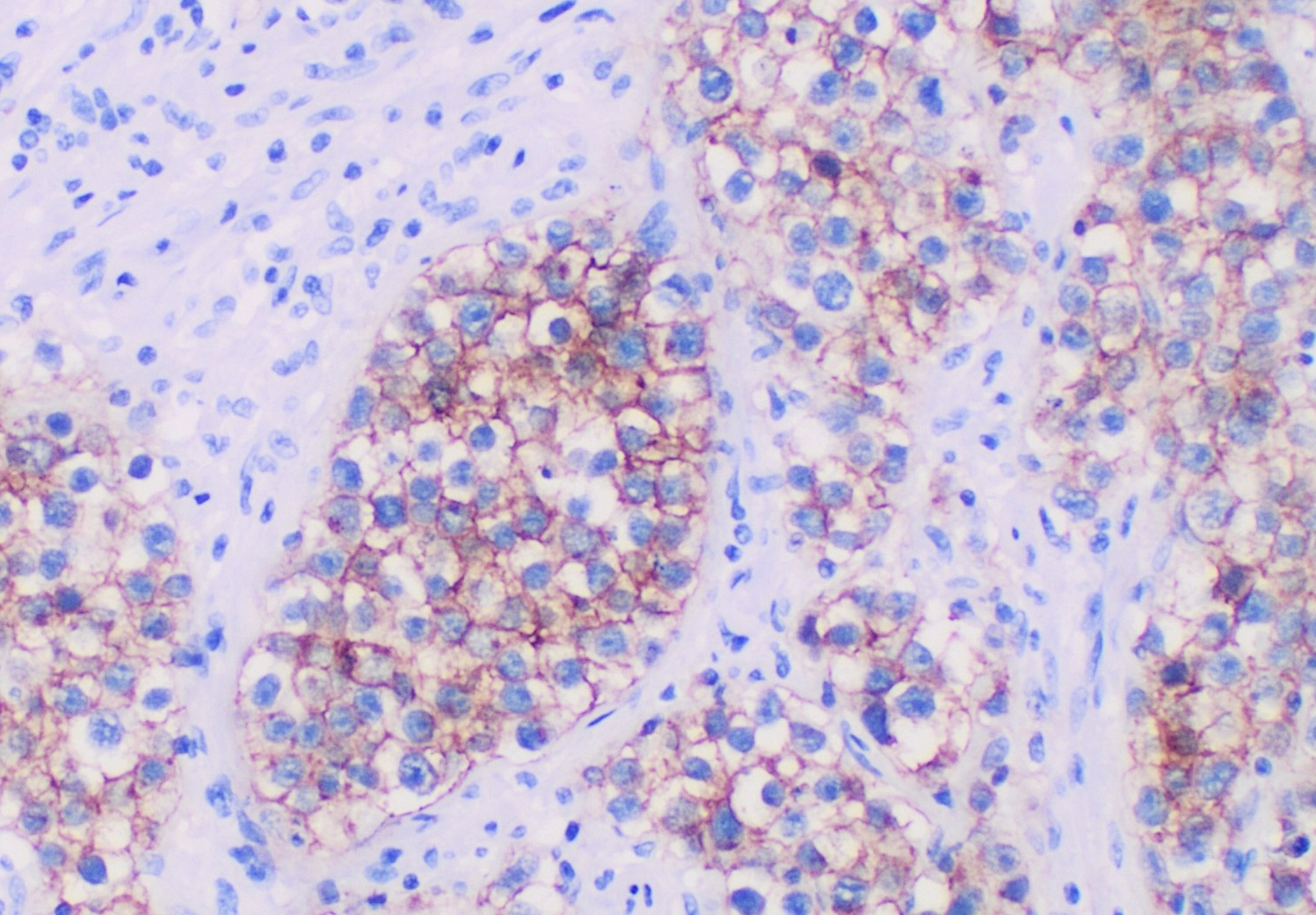
The germ cell markers OCT 3/4 and CD117 (positive immunohistochemistry pictured) are useful for diagnosis.

=== Relation to spermatocytic tumor ===
Spermatocytic tumors are not considered a subtype of seminoma and unlike other germ cell tumours do not arise from intratubular germ cell neoplasia.

== Treatment ==
Intratesticular masses that appear suspicious on an ultrasound should be treated with an inguinal orchiectomy. The pathology of the removed testicle and spermatic cord indicate the presence of the seminoma and assist in the staging. Tumors with both seminoma and nonseminoma elements or that occur with the presence of AFP should be treated as nonseminomas. Abdominal CT or MRI scans as well as chest imaging are done to detect for metastasis. The analysis of tumor markers also helps in staging.

The preferred treatment for most forms of stage 1 seminoma is active surveillance. Stage 1 seminoma is characterized by the absence of clinical evidence of metastasis. Active surveillance consists of periodic history and physical examinations, tumor marker analysis, and radiographic imaging. Around 85-95% of these cases will require no further treatment. Modern radiotherapy techniques as well as one or two cycles of single-agent carboplatin have been shown to reduce the risk of relapse, but carry the potential of causing delayed side effects. Regardless of treatment strategy, stage 1 seminoma has nearly a 100% cure rate.

Stage 2 seminoma is indicated by the presence of retroperitoneal metastasis. Cases require radiotherapy or, in advanced cases, combination chemotherapy. Large residual masses found after chemotherapy may require surgical resection. Second-line treatment is the same as for nonseminomas.

Stage 3 seminoma is characterized by the presence of metastasis outside the retroperitoneum—the lungs in "good risk" cases or elsewhere in "intermediate risk" cases. This is treated with combination chemotherapy. Second-line treatment follows nonseminoma protocols.
