= Elevated alpha-fetoprotein =

Elevated alphafetoprotein
- Specialty: Laboratory medicine

Elevated alpha-fetoprotein refers to a state where alpha-fetoprotein levels are outside of the reference range.

There are two categories of AFP tests: tests performed on serum (blood plasma), and tests performed on amniotic fluid. Tests performed on serum are further categorized by the reason for performing the test: maternal serum, adult tumor marker, and pediatric tumor marker.

== Serum ==
The standard is a quantitative test, reporting a measured concentration of AFP in the sample, but there is also a less expensive qualitative test, reporting only that the concentration is normal or high. The qualitative test is appropriate only in some circumstances.

The resulting test report should specify the assay method and equipment used, and the report of a quantitative test should also provide a reference range for the test result. Many laboratories report reference ranges that are based on all other samples tested in that laboratory, necessarily including samples with abnormal AFP concentrations due to disease. Superior reference ranges are produced by research on healthy subjects.

AFP test results often are reported as either ng/ml or MoM (multiple of the median, where the median is calculated for an appropriate reference population).

=== Maternal testing for fetal screening ===
Abnormally elevated AFP in the serum of a pregnant woman can have one or more of these sources:

- a problem with the fetus
- a problem with the placenta
- a tumor or liver disease in the woman
- a normally elevated AFP in the fetus or woman (some people naturally have very high AFP)

Usual follow-up steps include (1) a prenatal ultrasound exam to look for fetal abnormalities and/or (2) measurement of AFP in amniotic fluid obtained via amniocentesis.

Maternal serum AFP (MSAFP) varies by orders of magnitude during the course of a normal pregnancy. MSAFP increases rapidly until about 32 weeks gestation, then decreases gradually. After the pregnancy ends it decreases rapidly, with a half-life of about 5 days.

Typically, MSAFP is measured in the beginning of the second trimester (14–16 weeks). It may be measured alone or as part of a package of routine prenatal screening tests, such as a triple test or quad test.

Because MSAFP test results must be interpreted according to the gestational age, they often are reported in terms of multiple of the median (MoM). Because the median is calculated from tests of other women's pregnancies at the same gestational age, in effect MoM is independent of gestational age, but depend on accurate gestational dating. A typical normal range is 0.5 to 2.0 or 2.5 MoM.

- MSAFP above normal is seen in multiple gestation, when there is placental abruption, as well as in a number of fetal abnormalities, such as neural tube defects including spina bifida and anencephaly, and abdominal wall defects. Other possibility is error in the date of the gestation. Mothers with Methylenetetrahydrofolate reductase genetic variant also have more frequent elevated MSAFP. Rarely, high MSAFP is due to endodermal sinus tumor (EST) or another germ cell tumor containing EST. These tumors can occur in the pregnant woman (often as an ovarian tumor) or in the fetus.
- MSAFP below normal is associated with a smaller number of conditions, including Down syndrome and Trisomy 18. Diabetic patients also have lower levels.

Patients with abnormal MSAFP need to undergo detailed obstetric ultrasonography. The information is then used to decide whether to proceed with amniocentesis. Genetic counseling usually is offered when the screening test result is positive.

If a woman is already getting a Quad test for Down Syndrome screening, then the AFP-marker that is part of this test provides the screen result for neural-tube and abdominal wall defects. However, if a woman received a 1st Trimester Combined screen for Down Syndrome, which does not include AFP, then some physicians will specifically order an AFP-only test in the 2nd trimester to screen for neural tube/abdominal wall defects. However, because AFP-based screening only has an 80-85% sensitivity for neural tube and abdominal wall defects, many maternal-fetal medicine specialists and some obstetricians do not bother ordering an AFP test and instead perform detailed "Level-II" ultrasounds on all of their patients, which, in competent hands, results in a 97% sensitivity for these defects. In fact, these physicians might disregard the AFP-related information on neural tube/abdominal wall defects and do the detailed ultrasound to look for these defects even if the patient has a "normal" AFP reading.

=== Tumor marker ===
Principal tumors that secrete AFP are endodermal sinus tumor (yolk sac carcinoma), hepatoblastoma, and hepatocellular carcinoma. In patients with AFP-secreting tumors, serum levels of AFP often correlate with tumor size. Resection is usually associated with a fall in serum levels. Serum levels are useful in assessing response to treatment.

Like any elevated tumor marker, elevated AFP by itself is not diagnostic, only suggestive. Tumor markers are used primarily to monitor the result of a treatment (e.g. chemotherapy). If levels of AFP go down after treatment, the tumor is not growing. In the case of babies, after treatment AFP should go down faster than it would normally. A temporary increase in AFP immediately following chemotherapy may indicate not that the tumor is growing but rather that it is shrinking (and releasing AFP as the tumor cells die).

==== Nonseminomatous germ cell tumor ====
In the context of evidence-based medicine, AFP is validated at the highest level as a tumor marker for use in patients with nonseminomatous germ cell tumors.

There are case reports of elevated AFP associated with teratoma. However, some of these case reports involve infants but do not correct for the normal elevation of AFP in infants, while others ignore the likelihood that teratoma (and other germ cell tumors) may in fact be mixed tumors containing elements of endodermal sinus tumor.

AFP is normally elevated in infants, and because teratoma is the single most common kind of tumor in infants, several studies have provided reference ranges for AFP in normal infants. Perhaps the most useful is this equation: log Y = 7.397 - 2.622.log (X + 10), where X = age in days and Y = AFP level in nanograms per milliliter. When neonatal AFP is above normal (after adjustment for age), a low fraction of AFP-L3 is reassuring.

==== Hepatocellular carcinoma ====
For hepatocellular carcinoma (HCC), AFP cannot be considered to be specifically diagnostic of HCC, levels of AFP may be elevated in serum from patients with chronic disease; for example, research has indicated that AFP is not useful for screening in patients with cirrhosis or Hepatitis C and therefore elevated AFP in these patients may not be indicative, or be only suggestive, of HCC. AFP is considered a useful marker for post-treatment monitoring of HCC patients (e.g. for treatment efficacy or tumor recurrence). The value of such tests may be improved by parallel monitoring of other markers.

AFP-L3, an isoform of AFP which binds Lens culinaris agglutinin, can be particularly useful in early identification of aggressive tumors associated with HCC.

==== Other tumor ====
Rare AFP-secreting tumor types include carcinoma in a mixed Müllerian tumor. The Sertoli-Leydig cell tumor, which itself is rare, rarely secretes AFP.

In Wilms tumor AFP is rarely elevated, but when it is elevated it may serve as a marker of disease progression or recurrence.

=== Other ===
Increased serum levels in adults are also seen in acute hepatitis, colitis and ataxia telangiectasia. Increased serum levels of alpha-fetoprotein are sometimes found in citrullinemia and argininosuccinate synthetase deficiency.

== Amniotic fluid ==
AFP in amniotic fluid has one or two sources. The fetus normally excretes AFP into its urine, hence into the amniotic fluid. A fetus with one of three broad categories of defects also releases AFP by other means. These categories are open neural tube defect, open abdominal wall defect, and skin disease or other failure of the interior or exterior body surface.

Abnormally elevated AFP in amniotic fluid can have one or more of many different causes:

- normal elevation. 75% of AF AFP test results in the range 2.0 to 4.9 MoM are false positives: the baby is normal.
- open neural tube defect
- open abdominal wall defect
- congenital nephrosis
- others

== CSF ==
In normal infants, AFP in CSF is:

- median 61 kIU/L (5th-95th centile: 2-889 kIU/L) in infants -69 to 31 days old
- median 1.2 kIU/L (5th-95th centile: 0.1-12.5 kIU/L) in infants 32 to 110 days old

Levels of AFP in CSF decline with gestational age in proportion to levels of AFP in serum
