= Aspirin =

Anti-inflammatory medication

Acetylsalicylic acid
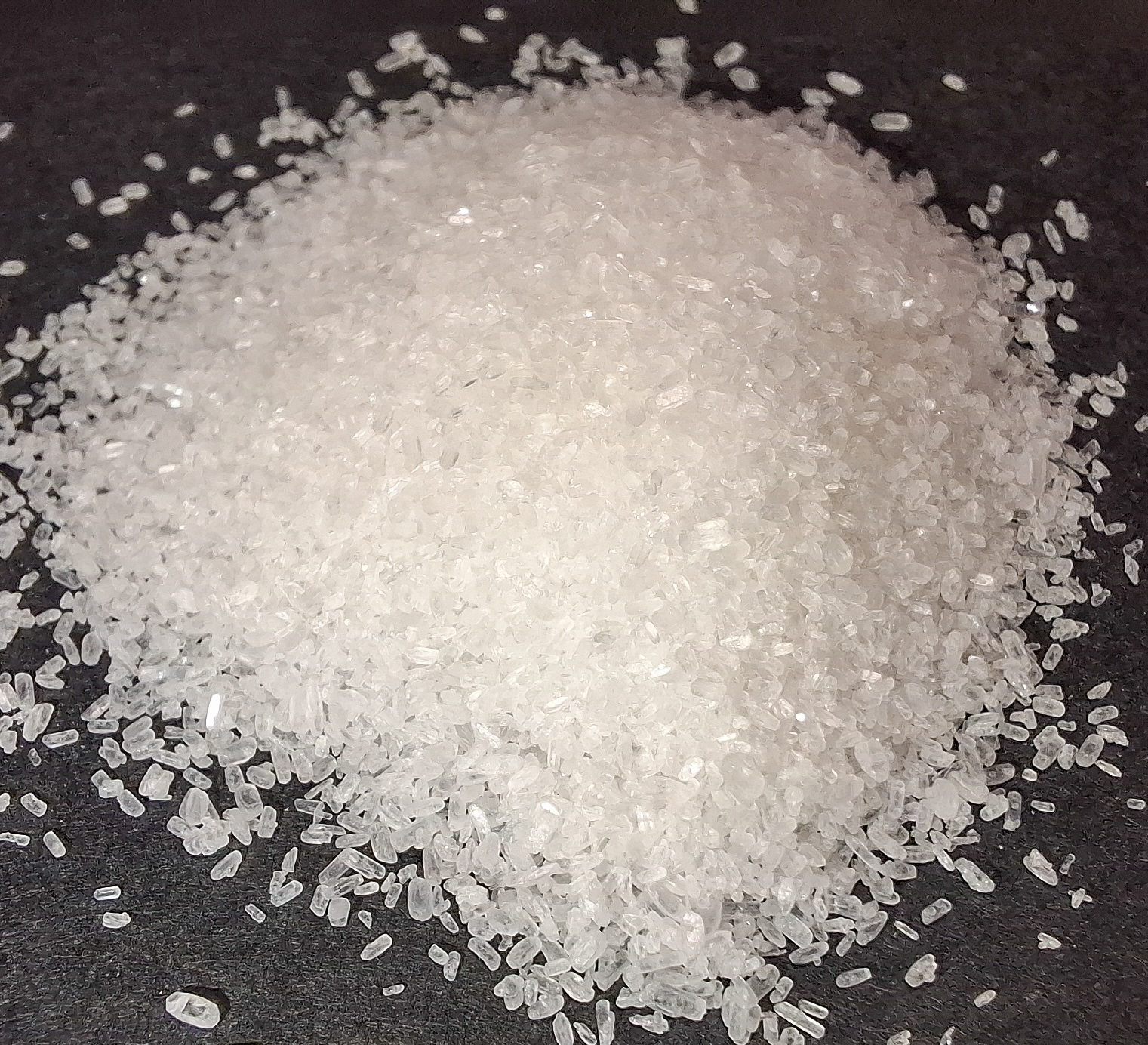
- Pure acetylsalicylic acid

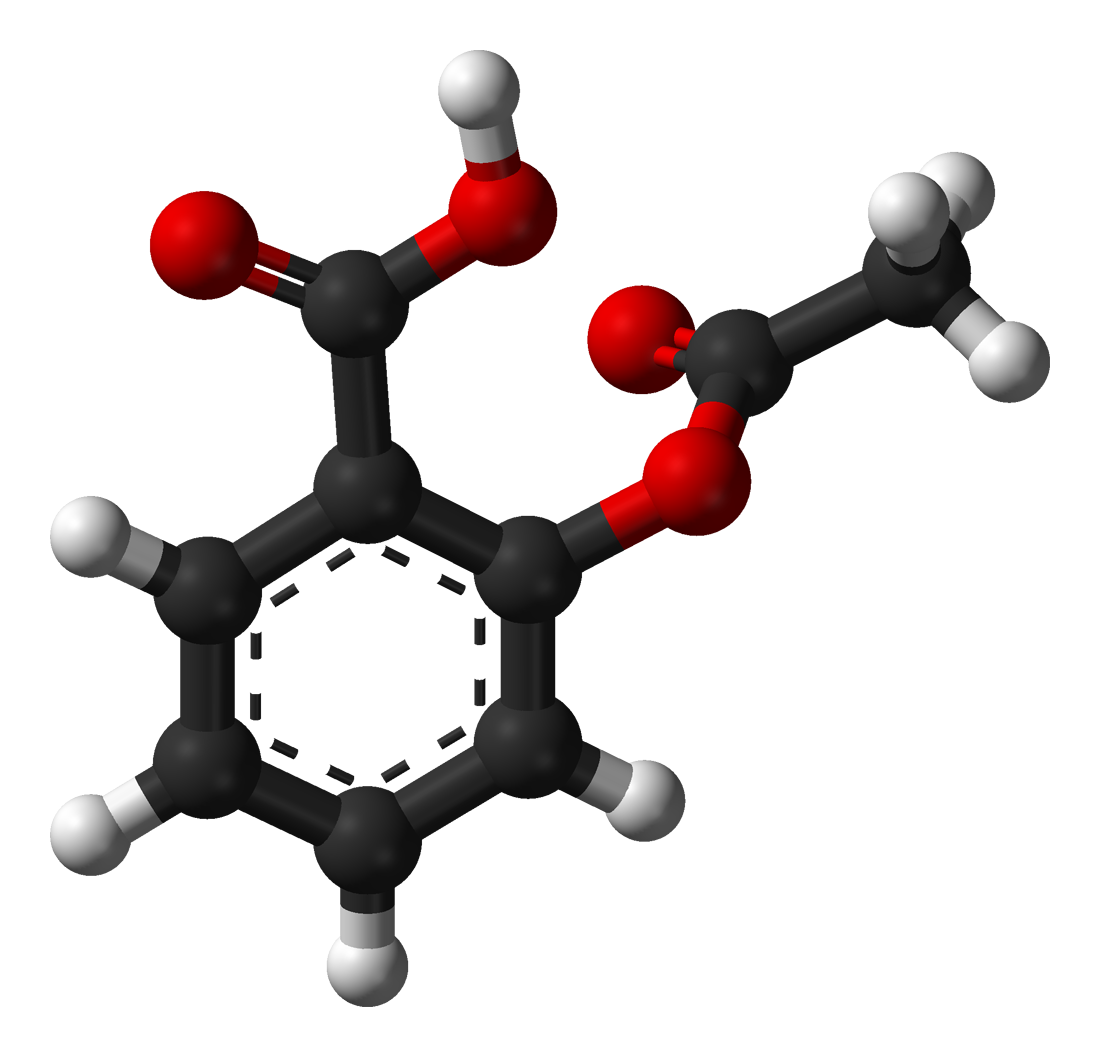

Clinical data
- Pronunciation: /əˌsiːtəlˌsælɪˈsɪlɪk/
- Trade names: Bayer Aspirin, others
- Other names: 2-acetoxybenzoic acid; 2-(acetyloxy)benzoic acid; 2-(ethanoyloxy)benzoic acid; o-acetylsalicylic acid; acetylsalicylic acid; acetyl salicylate; salicylic acid acetate; o-carboxyphenyl acetate; monoacetic acid ester of salicylic acid
- AHFS/Drugs.com: Monograph
- MedlinePlus: a682878
- License data: US DailyMed: Acetylsalicylic acid
- Pregnancy category: AU: C
- Routes of administration: Oral, rectal
- Drug class: Nonsteroidal anti-inflammatory drug (NSAID)
- ATC code: A01AD05 (WHO) B01AC06 (WHO), N02BA01 (WHO)

Legal status
- Legal status: AU: S6 (Poison) / Schedule 5; Schedule 4; Schedule 2 Appendix F, clause 4; CA: OTC; UK: General sales list (GSL, OTC); US: OTC / Rx-only; SE: OTC

Pharmacokinetic data
- Bioavailability: 80–100%
- Protein binding: 80–90%
- Metabolism: Liver (CYP2C19 and possibly CYP3A), some is also hydrolysed to salicylate in the gut wall.
- Elimination half-life: Dose-dependent; 2–3 h for low doses (100 mg or less), 15–30 h for larger doses.
- Excretion: Urine (80–100%), sweat, saliva, feces

Identifiers
- IUPAC name: 2-acetyloxybenzoic acid
- CAS Number: 50-78-2
- PubChem CID: 2244
- IUPHAR/BPS: 4139
- DrugBank: DB00945
- ChemSpider: 2157
- UNII: R16CO5Y76E
- KEGG: D00109; C01405
- ChEBI: CHEBI:15365
- ChEMBL: ChEMBL25
- PDB ligand: AIN (PDBe, RCSB PDB)
- CompTox Dashboard (EPA): DTXSID5020108
- ECHA InfoCard: 100.000.059

Chemical and physical data
- Formula: C_{9}H_{8}O_{4}
- Molar mass: 180.159 g·mol^{−1}
- 3D model (JSmol): Interactive image
- Density: 1.40 g/cm^{3}
- Melting point: 135 °C (275 °F)
- Solubility in water: 3 g/L
- SMILES: O=C(C)Oc1ccccc1C(=O)O
- InChI: InChI=1S/C9H8O4/c1-6(10)13-8-5-3-2-4-7(8)9(11)12/h2-5H,1H3,(H,11,12); Key:BSYNRYMUTXBXSQ-UHFFFAOYSA-N

Aspirin (/ˈæs.p(ə.)rɪn/) is the genericized trademark for acetylsalicylic acid (ASA), a nonsteroidal anti-inflammatory drug (NSAID) used to reduce pain, fever, and inflammation, and as an antithrombotic. Aspirin is used to treat inflammatory conditions including Kawasaki disease, pericarditis, and rheumatic fever.

Aspirin is also used long term to reduce the chance of heart attack, ischaemic stroke, and blood clots occurring in people considered to be at high risk for such events. For pain or fever, effects typically begin within 30 minutes. Aspirin works similarly to other NSAIDs but also suppresses the normal functioning of platelets.

One common adverse effect is an upset stomach. More significant side effects include stomach ulcers, stomach bleeding, and worsening asthma. Bleeding risk is greater among those who are older, drink alcohol, take other NSAIDs, or are on other blood thinners. Aspirin is not recommended in the last part of pregnancy. It is not generally recommended in children with viral infections because of the risk of Reye syndrome. High doses may result in ringing in the ears.

A precursor to aspirin found in the bark of the willow tree (genus Salix), salicin, is metabolized in the human gut into the medicinally active compound salicylic acid and has been used for its health effects for at least 2,400 years. Pharmacology sought a synthetic alternative. In 1853, the chemist Charles Frédéric Gerhardt treated the medicine sodium salicylate with acetyl chloride to produce acetylsalicylic acid for the first time. Over the next 50 years, other chemists, mostly of the German company Bayer, established the chemical structure and devised more efficient production methods. Felix Hoffmann (or perhaps Arthur Eichengrün) of Bayer was the first to produce acetylsalicylic acid in a pure, stable form in 1897. By 1899, Bayer had dubbed this drug Aspirin and was selling it globally.

Aspirin is available without medical prescription as a proprietary or generic medication in most jurisdictions. It is one of the most widely used medications globally, with an estimated 40,000 tonnes (44,000 tons) (50 to 120 billion pills) consumed each year, and is on the World Health Organization's List of Essential Medicines. In 2023, it was the 46th most commonly prescribed medication in the United States, with more than 14 million prescriptions.

== Brand vs. generic name ==
In 1897, scientists at the Bayer company began studying acetylsalicylic acid as a less-irritating replacement medication for common salicylate medicines. It developed heroin in 1898 as a cough suppressant, and the less potent aspirin the following year. By 1899, Bayer had named it "Aspirin" and was selling it around the world.

Aspirin's popularity grew over the first half of the 20th century, leading to competition between many brands and formulations. The word Aspirin was Bayer's brand name; however, its rights to the trademark were lost or sold in many countries. The name is ultimately a blend of the prefix a(cetyl) + spir, from Spirsäure, German for meadowsweet, the plant genus from which the aspirin precursor salicylic acid was first isolated (originally Spiraea, now Filipendula) + -in, the common suffix for drugs near the end of the 19th century.

== Chemical properties ==
Aspirin decomposes rapidly in solutions of ammonium acetate or the acetates, carbonates, citrates, or hydroxides of the alkali metals. It is stable in dry air, but gradually hydrolyses in contact with moisture to acetic and salicylic acids. In a solution with alkalis, the hydrolysis proceeds rapidly and the clear solutions formed may consist entirely of acetate and salicylate.

Like flour mills, factories producing aspirin tablets must control the amount of the powder that becomes airborne inside the building, because the powder-air mixture can be explosive. The National Institute for Occupational Safety and Health (NIOSH) has set a recommended exposure limit in the United States of 5 mg/m^{3} (time-weighted average). In 1989, the US Occupational Safety and Health Administration (OSHA) set a legal permissible exposure limit for aspirin of 5 mg/m^{3}, but this was vacated by the AFL-CIO v. OSHA decision in 1993.

=== Synthesis ===
The synthesis of aspirin is classified as an esterification reaction. Salicylic acid is treated with acetic anhydride, an acid derivative, causing a chemical reaction that turns salicylic acid's hydroxyl group into an ester group (R-OH → R-OCOCH_{3}). This process yields aspirin and acetic acid, which is considered a byproduct of this reaction. Small amounts of sulfuric acid (and occasionally phosphoric acid) are almost always used as a catalyst. This method is commonly demonstrated in undergraduate teaching labs.

Aspirin synthesis

Reaction between acetic acid and salicylic acid can also form aspirin but this esterification reaction is reversible and the presence of water can lead to hydrolysis of the aspirin. So, an anhydrous reagent is preferred.

Reaction mechanism

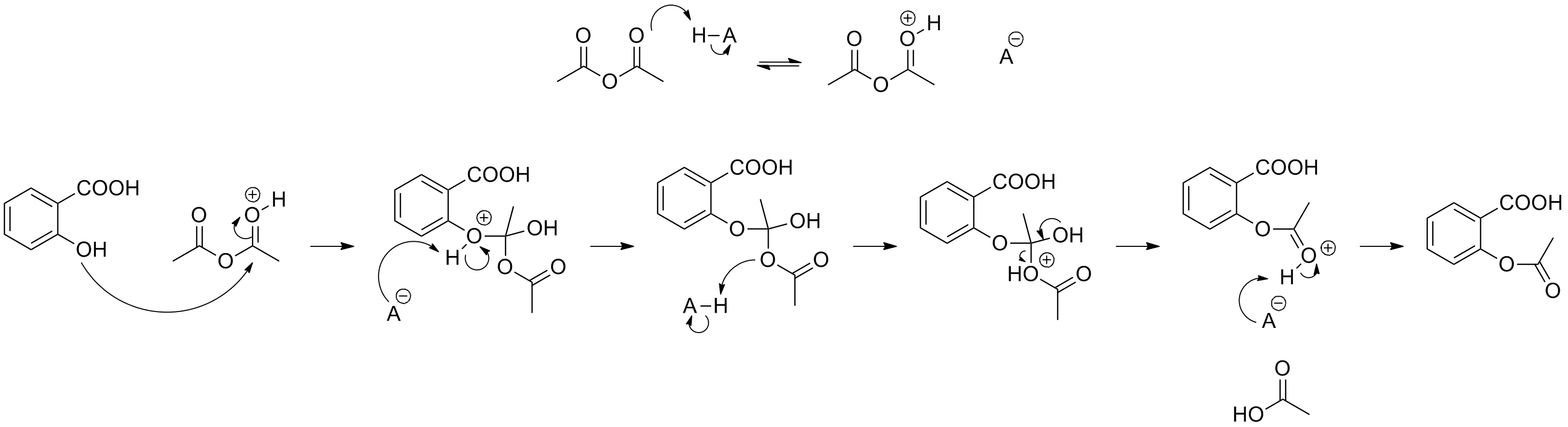
Acetylation of salicylic acid, mechanism

Formulations containing high concentrations of aspirin often smell like vinegar because aspirin can decompose through hydrolysis in moist conditions, yielding salicylic and acetic acids.

== Physical properties ==
Aspirin, an acetyl derivative of salicylic acid, is a white, crystalline, weakly acidic substance that melts at 136 °C (277 °F), and decomposes around 140 °C (284 °F). Its acid dissociation constant (pK_{a}) is 3.5 at 25 °C (77 °F).

=== Polymorphism ===
Polymorphism is the ability of a substance to form more than one crystal structure. Until 2005, there was only one proven polymorph of aspirin (form I), though the existence of another polymorph was debated since the 1960s, and one report from 1981 reported that when crystallized in the presence of aspirin anhydride, the diffractogram of aspirin has weak additional peaks. Though at the time it was dismissed as mere impurity, it was, in retrospect, form II aspirin.

Form II was reported in 2005, found after attempted co-crystallization of aspirin and levetiracetam from hot acetonitrile. Pure form II aspirin can be prepared by seeding the batch with aspirin anhydrate in 15% weight.

In form I, pairs of aspirin molecules form centrosymmetric dimers through the acetyl groups with the (acidic) methyl proton to carbonyl hydrogen bonds. In form II, each aspirin molecule forms the same hydrogen bonds, but with two neighbouring molecules instead of one. With respect to the hydrogen bonds formed by the carboxylic acid groups, both polymorphs form identical dimer structures. The aspirin polymorphs contain identical 2-dimensional sections and are therefore more precisely described as polytypes.

Form III was reported in 2015 by compressing Form I above 2 GPa, but it reverts to form I when pressure is removed. Form IV was reported in 2017, which is stable at ambient conditions.

== Mechanism of action ==
=== Discovery of the mechanism ===
In 1971, the British pharmacologist John Robert Vane, then employed by the Royal College of Surgeons in London, showed that aspirin suppressed the production of prostaglandins and thromboxanes. For this discovery, he was awarded the 1982 Nobel Prize in Physiology or Medicine, jointly with Sune Bergström and Bengt Ingemar Samuelsson.

=== Prostaglandins and thromboxanes ===
Aspirin's ability to suppress the production of prostaglandins and thromboxanes is due to its irreversible inactivation of the cyclooxygenase (COX; officially known as prostaglandin-endoperoxide synthase, PTGS) enzyme required for prostaglandin and thromboxane synthesis. Aspirin acts as an acetylating agent where an acetyl group is covalently attached to a serine residue in the active site of the COX enzyme (suicide inhibition). This makes aspirin different from other NSAIDs (such as diclofenac and ibuprofen), which are reversible inhibitors.

Low-dose aspirin use irreversibly blocks the formation of thromboxane A_{2} in platelets, which inhibits platelet aggregation during the lifetime of the affected platelet (8–9 days). This antithrombotic property makes aspirin useful for reducing the incidence of heart attacks in people who have had a heart attack, unstable angina, ischemic stroke or transient ischemic attack. 40 mg of aspirin a day is able to inhibit a large proportion of maximum thromboxane A_{2} release provoked acutely, with the prostaglandin I_{2} synthesis being little affected; however, higher doses of aspirin are required to attain further inhibition.

Prostaglandins, a type of hormone, have diverse effects, including the transmission of pain information to the brain, modulation of the hypothalamic thermostat, and inflammation. Thromboxanes are responsible for the aggregation of platelets that form blood clots. Heart attacks are caused primarily by blood clots, and low doses of aspirin are seen as an effective medical intervention to prevent a second acute myocardial infarction.

=== COX-1 and COX-2 inhibition ===
At least two different types of cyclooxygenases, COX-1 and COX-2, are acted on by aspirin. Aspirin irreversibly inhibits COX-1 and modifies the enzymatic activity of COX-2. COX-2 normally produces prostanoids, most of which are proinflammatory. Aspirin-modified COX-2 produces epi-lipoxins, most of which are anti-inflammatory. Newer NSAID drugs, COX-2 inhibitors (coxibs), have been developed to inhibit only COX-2, with the intent to reduce the incidence of gastrointestinal side effects.

Several COX-2 inhibitors, such as rofecoxib (Vioxx), have been withdrawn from the market, after evidence emerged that COX-2 inhibitors increase the risk of heart attack and stroke. Endothelial cells lining the microvasculature in the body are proposed to express COX-2, and, by selectively inhibiting COX-2, prostaglandin production (specifically, PGI_{2}; prostacyclin) is downregulated with respect to thromboxane levels, as COX-1 in platelets is unaffected. Thus, the protective anticoagulative effect of PGI_{2} is removed, increasing the risk of thrombus and associated heart attacks and other circulatory problems.

Furthermore, aspirin, while inhibiting the ability of COX-2 to form pro-inflammatory products such as the prostaglandins, converts this enzyme's activity from a prostaglandin-forming cyclooxygenase to a lipoxygenase-like enzyme: aspirin-treated COX-2 metabolizes a variety of polyunsaturated fatty acids to hydroperoxy products which are then further metabolized to specialized proresolving mediators such as the aspirin-triggered lipoxins(15-epilipoxin-A4/B4), aspirin-triggered resolvins, and aspirin-triggered maresins. These mediators possess potent anti-inflammatory activity. It is proposed that this aspirin-triggered transition of COX-2 from cyclooxygenase to lipoxygenase activity and the consequential formation of specialized proresolving mediators contributes to the anti-inflammatory effects of aspirin.

=== Additional mechanisms ===
Aspirin has been shown to have at least three additional modes of action. It uncouples oxidative phosphorylation in cartilaginous (and hepatic) mitochondria, by diffusing from the inner membrane space as a proton carrier back into the mitochondrial matrix, where it ionizes once again to release protons. Aspirin buffers and transports the protons. When high doses are given, it may actually cause fever, owing to the heat released from the electron transport chain, as opposed to the antipyretic action of aspirin seen with lower doses. In addition, aspirin induces the formation of NO-radicals in the body, which have been shown in mice to have an independent mechanism of reducing inflammation. This reduced leukocyte adhesion is an important step in the immune response to infection; however, evidence is insufficient to show that aspirin helps to fight infection. More recent data also suggest salicylic acid and its derivatives modulate signalling through NF-κB. NF-κB, a transcription factor complex, plays a central role in many biological processes, including inflammation.

Aspirin is readily broken down in the body to salicylic acid, which itself has anti-inflammatory, antipyretic, and analgesic effects. In 2012, salicylic acid was found to activate AMP-activated protein kinase, which has been suggested as a possible explanation for some of the effects of both salicylic acid and aspirin. The acetyl portion of the aspirin molecule has its own targets. Acetylation of cellular proteins is a well-established phenomenon in the regulation of protein function at the post-translational level. Aspirin is able to acetylate several other targets in addition to COX isoenzymes. These acetylation reactions may explain many hitherto unexplained effects of aspirin.

== Formulations ==
Aspirin is available in a variety of pharmaceutical formulations, each with distinct pharmacological and safety profiles. A key concern in aspirin therapy is the risk of gastrointestinal bleeding, prompting the development of formulations aimed at maintaining efficacy while minimizing gastrointestinal harm. Some formulations are also combined, for example, buffered aspirin with vitamin C. Formulation examples include:

- Immediate-release tablets (IR-ASA): Commonly contain 75–100 mg or 300–320 mg of aspirin and are rapidly absorbed in the stomach.
- Enteric-coated tablets (EC-ASA): Designed to dissolve in the higher pH environment of the small intestine, reducing gastric irritation but sometimes leading to erratic absorption.
- Buffered formulations: Contain aspirin with buffering agents to reduce GI irritation; studies show similar mucosal injury rates to plain aspirin.
- Aspirin combined with vitamin C (ASA-VitC): Reduces gastric damage and blood loss compared to plain aspirin.
- Effervescent tablets are a specialized oral dosage form containing aspirin and an effervescent base—typically a combination of citric acid, tartaric acid, and sodium bicarbonate. When dissolved in water, these tablets produce a fizzy reaction that rapidly disperses the drug throughout the solution.
- Phospholipid-aspirin complex liquid formulation (PL-ASA): Novel, FDA-approved and under further investigation for its ability to reduce GI injury while maintaining reliable platelet inhibition.

Aspirin formulations differ significantly in terms of pharmacokinetics, efficacy, and gastrointestinal safety. Enteric-coated (EC) aspirin, developed to reduce gastric irritation by delaying release until the small intestine, exhibits erratic absorption and reduced bioavailability, particularly in individuals with body weight over 70 kg. This can lead to suboptimal thromboxane A2 inhibition and decreased antiplatelet efficacy compared to plain aspirin. This diminished pharmacodynamic effect has been associated with reduced cardiovascular protection in heavier individuals. Although EC aspirin is associated with fewer gastric erosions in endoscopic studies, it does not significantly reduce gastrointestinal bleeding or ulceration, and may increase the risk of small bowel mucosal injury due to local topical effects

Buffered aspirin, which includes agents to neutralize gastric acid, similarly offers no clear safety advantage over plain aspirin.

Novel formulations such as the phospholipid-aspirin complex (PL-ASA) attempt to overcome these limitations by pre-associating aspirin with lipid excipients. PL-ASA has been shown to reduce acute gastric injury while providing predictable absorption and bioequivalence to plain aspirin, with no significant food effect. This formulation achieves consistent platelet inhibition with reduced interindividual variability in pharmacodynamic response compared to EC aspirin.

For long-term prevention, a network meta-analysis suggests that a daily dose of 100 mg of coated aspirin may provide optimal protection against all-cause mortality and cancer, while higher doses are more effective in reducing cardiovascular events and lower doses may be better tolerated. Nonetheless, plain aspirin remains the preferred formulation for cardiovascular prevention due to its superior and consistent pharmacokinetic properties.

== Pharmacokinetics ==
Acetylsalicylic acid is a weak acid, and very little of it is ionized in the stomach after oral administration. Acetylsalicylic acid is quickly absorbed through the cell membrane in the acidic conditions of the stomach. The higher pH and larger surface area of the small intestine cause aspirin to be absorbed more slowly there, as more of it is ionized. Owing to the formation of concretions, aspirin is absorbed much more slowly during overdose, and blood plasma concentrations can continue to rise for up to 24 hours after ingestion.

About 50–80% of salicylate in the blood is bound to human serum albumin, while the rest remains in the active, ionized state; protein binding is concentration-dependent. Saturation of binding sites leads to more free salicylate and increased toxicity. The volume of distribution is 0.1–0.2 L/kg. Acidosis increases the volume of distribution because of enhancement of tissue penetration of salicylates.

As much as 80% of therapeutic doses of salicylic acid is metabolized in the liver. Conjugation with glycine forms salicyluric acid, and with glucuronic acid to form two different glucuronide esters. The conjugate with the acetyl group intact is referred to as the acyl glucuronide; the deacetylated conjugate is the phenolic glucuronide. These metabolic pathways have only a limited capacity. Small amounts of salicylic acid are also hydroxylated to gentisic acid. With large salicylate doses, the kinetics switch from first-order to zero-order, as metabolic pathways become saturated and renal excretion becomes increasingly important.

Salicylates are excreted mainly by the kidneys as salicyluric acid (75%), free salicylic acid (10%), salicylic phenol (10%), acyl glucuronides (5%), gentisic acid (< 1%), and 2,3-dihydroxybenzoic acid. When small doses (less than 250 mg in an adult) are ingested, all pathways proceed by first-order kinetics, with an elimination half-life of about 2.0 h to 4.5 h. When higher doses of salicylate are ingested (more than 4 g), the half-life becomes much longer (15 h to 30 h), because the biotransformation pathways concerned with the formation of salicyluric acid and salicyl phenolic glucuronide become saturated. Renal excretion of salicylic acid becomes increasingly important as the metabolic pathways become saturated, because it is extremely sensitive to changes in urinary pH. A 10- to 20-fold increase in renal clearance occurs when urine pH is increased from 5 to 8. The use of urinary alkalinization exploits this particular aspect of salicylate elimination. It was found that short-term aspirin use in therapeutic doses might precipitate reversible acute kidney injury when the patient was ill with glomerulonephritis or cirrhosis. Aspirin for some patients with chronic kidney disease and some children with congestive heart failure was contraindicated.

== History ==
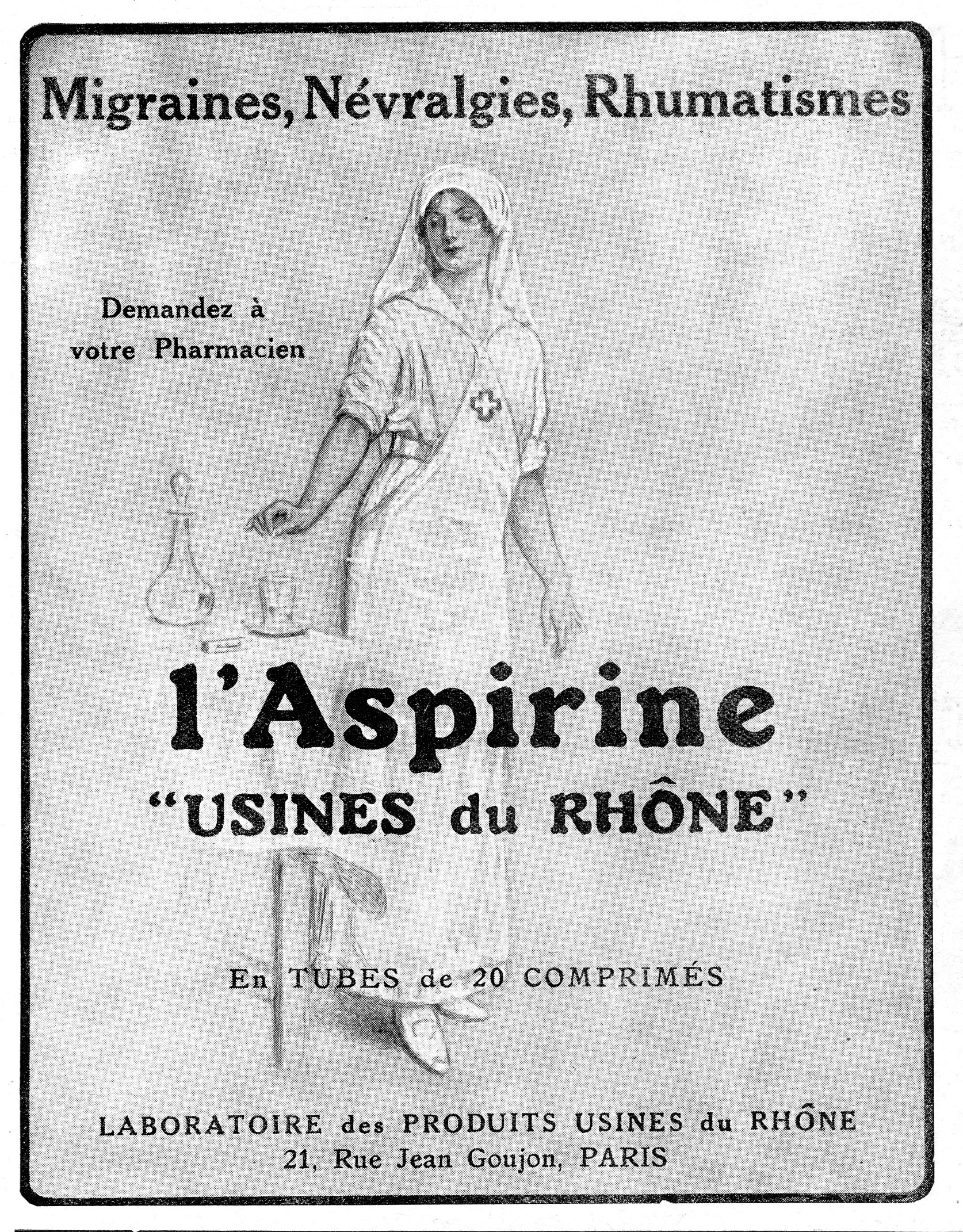
1923 advertisement

Medicines made from willow and other salicylate-rich plants appear in clay tablets from ancient Sumer as well as the Ebers Papyrus from ancient Egypt. Hippocrates referred to the use of salicylic tea to reduce fevers around 400 BC, and willow bark preparations were part of the pharmacopoeia of Western medicine in classical antiquity and the Middle Ages. Willow bark extract became recognized for its specific effects on fever, pain, and inflammation in the mid-eighteenth century after the Rev Edward Stone of Chipping Norton, Oxfordshire, noticed that the bitter taste of willow bark resembled the taste of the bark of the cinchona tree, known as "Peruvian bark", which was used successfully in Peru to treat a variety of ailments. Stone experimented with preparations of powdered willow bark on people in Chipping Norton for five years and found it to be as effective as Peruvian bark and a cheaper domestic version. In 1763, he sent a report of his findings to the Royal Society in London. By the nineteenth century, pharmacists were experimenting with and prescribing a variety of chemicals related to salicylic acid, the active component of willow extract.

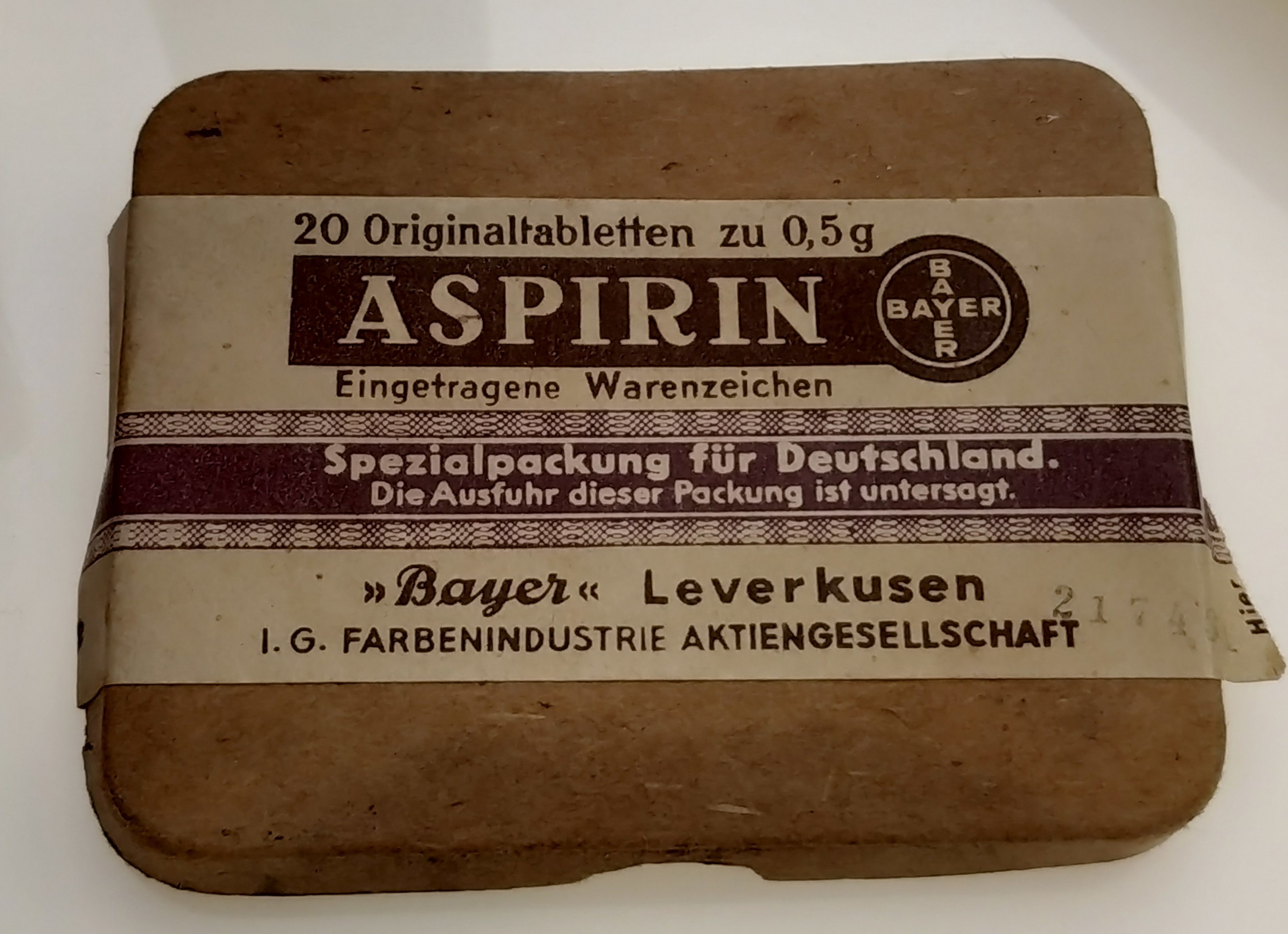
Old package. "Export from Germany is prohibited"

In 1853, the chemist Charles Frédéric Gerhardt treated sodium salicylate with acetyl chloride to produce acetylsalicylic acid for the first time; in the second half of the 19th century, other academic chemists established the compound's chemical structure and devised more efficient methods of synthesis. In 1897, scientists at the drug and dye firm Bayer began investigating acetylsalicylic acid as a less-irritating replacement for standard common salicylate medicines, and identified a new way to synthesize it. That year, Felix Hoffmann (or Arthur Eichengrün) of Bayer was the first to produce acetylsalicylic acid in a pure, stable form.

Salicylic acid had been extracted in 1839 from the herb meadowsweet, whose German name, Spirsäure, was the basis for naming the newly synthesized drug, which, by 1899, Bayer was selling globally. The word Aspirin was Bayer's brand name, rather than the generic name of the drug; however, Bayer's rights to the trademark were lost or sold in many countries. Aspirin's popularity grew over the first half of the 20th century, leading to fierce competition with the proliferation of aspirin brands and products.

Aspirin's popularity declined after the development of acetaminophen/paracetamol in 1956 and ibuprofen in 1962. In the 1960s and 1970s, John Vane and others discovered the basic mechanism of aspirin's effects, while clinical trials and other studies from the 1960s to the 1980s established aspirin's efficacy as an anti-clotting agent that reduces the risk of clotting diseases. The initial large studies on the use of low-dose aspirin to prevent heart attacks that were published in the 1970s and 1980s helped spur reform in clinical research ethics and guidelines for human subject research and US federal law, and are often cited as examples of clinical trials that included only men, but from which people drew general conclusions that did not hold true for women.

Aspirin sales revived considerably in the last decades of the 20th century, and remain strong in the 21st century with widespread use as a preventive treatment for heart attacks and strokes.

=== Trademark ===
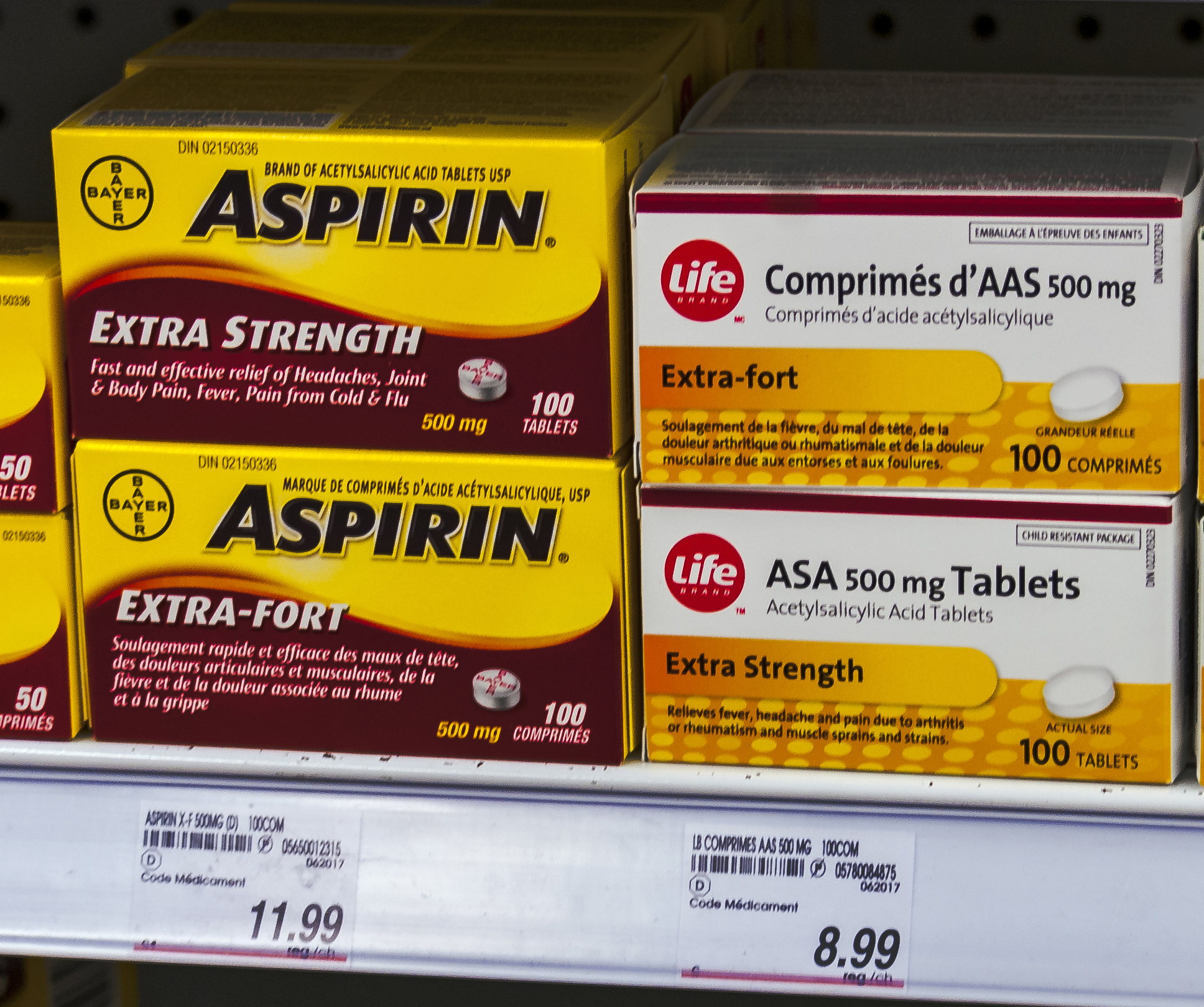
In Canada and many other countries, "Aspirin" remains a trademark, so generic aspirin is sold as "ASA" (acetylsalicylic acid).

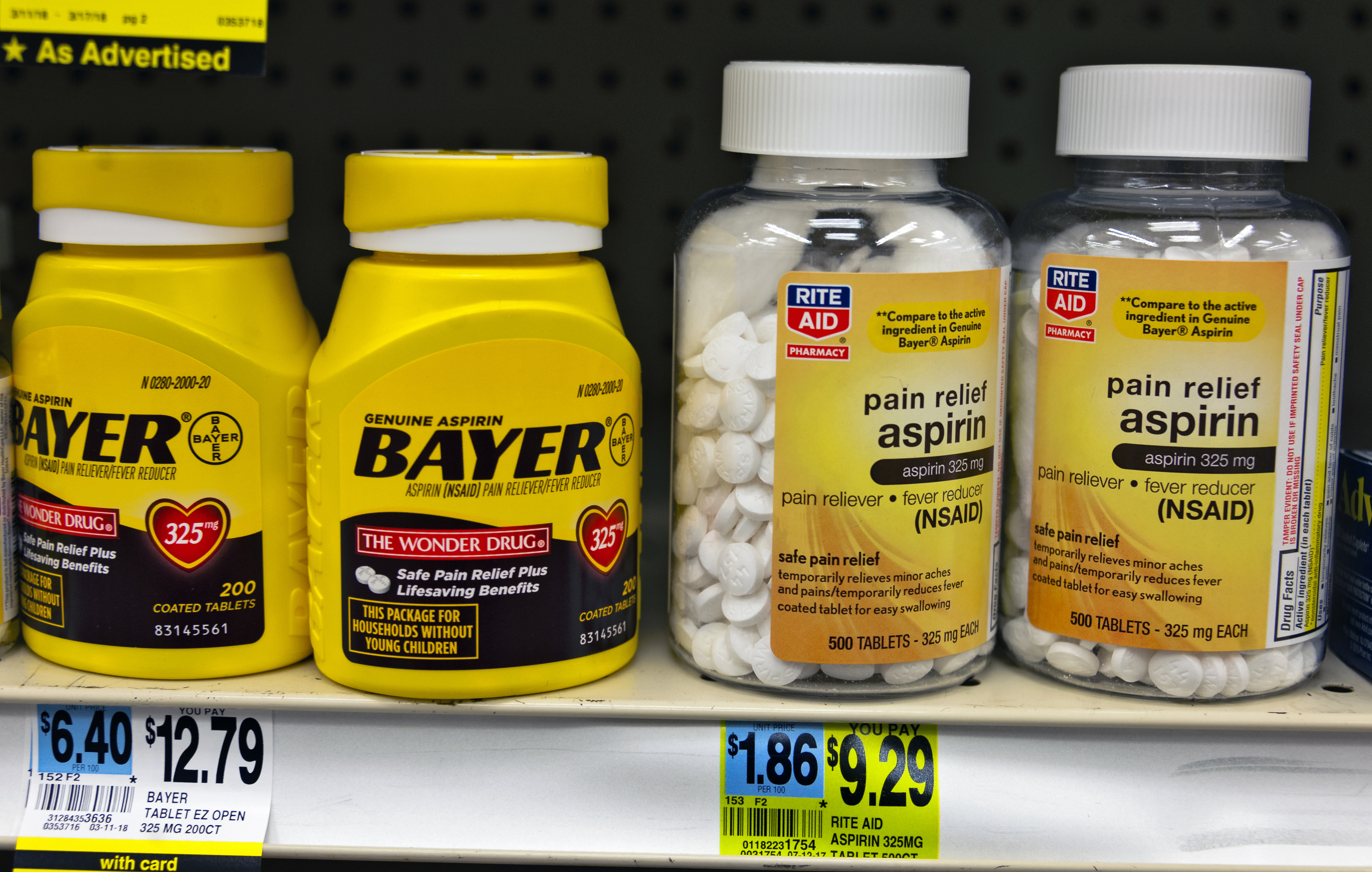
In the US, "aspirin" is a generic name.

Bayer lost its trademark for aspirin in the United States and some other countries in actions taken between 1918 and 1921, because it had failed to use the name for its own product correctly and had for years allowed the use of "Aspirin" by other manufacturers without defending the intellectual property rights. Aspirin is a generic trademark in many countries. Aspirin, with a capital "A", remains a registered trademark of Bayer in Germany, Canada, Mexico, and over 80 other countries, for acetylsalicylic acid in all markets, but using different packaging and physical aspects for each.

=== Compendial status ===
- United States Pharmacopeia
- British Pharmacopoeia

== Medical use ==
Aspirin is used in the treatment of a number of conditions, including fever, pain, rheumatic fever, and inflammatory conditions, such as rheumatoid arthritis, pericarditis, and Kawasaki disease. Lower doses of aspirin have also been shown to reduce the risk of death from a myocardial infarction (heart attack), or the risk of stroke in people who are at high risk or who have cardiovascular disease, but not in older adults who are otherwise healthy. There is evidence that aspirin is effective for preventing colorectal cancer, though the mechanisms of this effect are unclear. There is also evidence that aspirin can treat some cases of vasculogenic ED.

=== Pain ===
Aspirin is an effective analgesic for acute pain, although it is generally considered inferior to ibuprofen because aspirin is more likely to cause gastrointestinal bleeding. Aspirin is generally ineffective for pain caused by muscle cramps, bloating, gastric distension, or acute skin irritation. As with other NSAIDs, combinations of aspirin and caffeine provide slightly greater pain relief than aspirin alone. Effervescent formulations of aspirin relieve pain faster than aspirin in tablets, which makes them useful for the treatment of migraines. Topical aspirin may be effective for treating some types of neuropathic pain.

Aspirin, either by itself or in a combined formulation, effectively treats certain types of a headache, but its efficacy may be questionable for others. Secondary headaches, meaning those caused by another disorder or trauma, should be promptly treated by a medical provider. Among primary headaches, the International Classification of Headache Disorders distinguishes between tension headache (the most common), migraine, and cluster headache. Aspirin or other over-the-counter analgesics are widely recognized as effective for the treatment of tension headaches. Aspirin, especially as a component of an aspirin/paracetamol/caffeine combination, is considered a first-line therapy in the treatment of migraine, and comparable to lower doses of sumatriptan. It is most effective at stopping migraines when they are first beginning.

=== Fever ===
Like its ability to control pain, aspirin's ability to control fever is due to its action on the prostaglandin system through its irreversible inhibition of COX, unlike other drugs such as ibuprofen which reversibly bind to COX. Although aspirin's use as an antipyretic in adults is well established, many medical societies and regulatory agencies, including the American Academy of Family Physicians, the American Academy of Pediatrics, and the Food and Drug Administration, strongly advise against using aspirin for the treatment of fever in children because of the risk of Reye syndrome, a rare but often fatal illness associated with the use of aspirin or other salicylates in children during episodes of viral or bacterial infection. Because of the risk of Reye syndrome in children, in 1986, the US Food and Drug Administration (FDA) required prescribing information on all aspirin-containing medications advising against its use in children and teenagers.

=== Inflammation ===
Aspirin is used as an anti-inflammatory agent for both acute and long-term inflammation, as well as for the treatment of inflammatory diseases, such as rheumatoid arthritis.

=== Heart attacks and strokes ===
Aspirin is an important part of the treatment of those who have had a heart attack. It is generally not recommended for routine use by people with no other health problems, including those over the age of 70.

The 2009 Antithrombotic Trialists' Collaboration published in The Lancet evaluated the efficacy and safety of low-dose aspirin (the so-called "baby aspirin") in secondary prevention. In those with prior ischaemic stroke or acute myocardial infarction, daily low dose aspirin was associated with a 19% relative risk reduction of serious cardiovascular events (non-fatal myocardial infarction, non-fatal stroke, or vascular death). This did come at the expense of a 0.19% absolute risk increase in gastrointestinal bleeding; however, the benefits outweigh the hazard risk in this case. Data from previous trials have suggested that weight-based dosing of aspirin has greater benefits in primary prevention of cardiovascular outcomes. However, more recent trials were not able to replicate similar outcomes using low dose aspirin in those with low body weight (<70 kg; <150 lbs) in specific subset of population studied (i.e. elderly and diabetic population), and more evidence is required to study the effect of high dose aspirin in high body weight (≥70 kg; ≥150lbs).

After percutaneous coronary interventions (PCIs), such as the placement of a coronary artery stent, a U.S. Agency for Healthcare Research and Quality guideline recommends that aspirin be taken indefinitely. Frequently, aspirin is combined with an ADP receptor inhibitor, such as clopidogrel, prasugrel, or ticagrelor to prevent blood clots. This is called dual antiplatelet therapy (DAPT). Duration of DAPT was advised in the United States and European Union guidelines after the CURE and PRODIGY studies. In 2020, the systematic review and network meta-analysis from Khan et al. showed promising benefits of short-term (< 6 months) DAPT followed by P2Y12 inhibitors in selected patients, as well as the benefits of extended-term (> 12 months) DAPT in high risk patients. In conclusion, the optimal duration of DAPT after PCIs should be personalized after weighing each patient's risks of ischemic events and risks of bleeding events with consideration of multiple patient-related and procedure-related factors. Moreover, aspirin should be continued indefinitely after DAPT is complete.

The status of the use of aspirin for the primary prevention in cardiovascular disease is conflicting and inconsistent, with recent changes from previously recommending it widely decades ago, and that some referenced newer trials in clinical guidelines show less of benefit of adding aspirin alongside other anti-hypertensive and cholesterol lowering therapies. The ASCEND study demonstrated that in high-bleeding risk diabetics with no prior cardiovascular disease, there is no overall clinical benefit (12% decrease in risk of ischaemic events v/s 29% increase in GI bleeding) of low dose aspirin in preventing the serious vascular events over a period of 7.4 years. Similarly, the results of the ARRIVE study showed no benefit of the same aspirin dose in reducing the time to first cardiovascular outcome in patients with moderate cardiovascular disease risk over 5 years. Aspirin has also been suggested as a component of a polypill for prevention of cardiovascular disease. Complicating the use of aspirin for prevention is the phenomenon of aspirin resistance. For patients who are resistant, aspirin's efficacy is reduced. Some authors have suggested testing regimens to identify people who are resistant to aspirin.

As of April 2022, the United States Preventive Services Task Force (USPSTF) determined that there was a "small net benefit" for patients aged 40–59 with a 10% or greater 10-year cardiovascular disease (CVD) risk, and "no net benefit" for patients aged over 60. Determining the net benefit was based on balancing the risk reduction of taking aspirin for heart attacks and ischaemic strokes, with the increased risk of gastrointestinal bleeding, intracranial bleeding, and hemorrhagic strokes. Their recommendations state that age changes the risk of the medicine, with the magnitude of the benefit of aspirin coming from starting at a younger age, while the risk of bleeding, while small, increases with age, particular for adults over 60, and can be compounded by other risk factors such as diabetes and a history of gastrointestinal bleeding. As a result, the USPSTF suggests that "people ages 40 to 59 who are at higher risk for CVD should decide with their clinician whether to start taking aspirin; people 60 or older should not start taking aspirin to prevent a first heart attack or stroke." Primary prevention guidelines from September 2019 made by the American College of Cardiology and the American Heart Association state they might consider aspirin for patients aged 40–69 with a higher risk of atherosclerotic CVD, without an increased bleeding risk, while stating they would not recommend aspirin for patients aged over 70 or adults of any age with an increased bleeding risk. They state a CVD risk estimation and a risk discussion should be done before starting on aspirin, while stating aspirin should be used "infrequently in the routine primary prevention of (atherosclerotic CVD) because of lack of net benefit". As of August 2021, the European Society of Cardiology made similar recommendations; considering aspirin specifically to patients aged less than 70 at high or very high CVD risk, without any clear contraindications, on a case-by-case basis, considering both ischemic risk and bleeding risk.

=== Cancer prevention ===
Aspirin use may reduce the overall risk of both getting cancer and dying from cancer. There is substantial evidence for lowering the risk of colorectal cancer (CRC), but aspirin must be taken for at least 10–20 years to see this benefit. It may also slightly reduce the risk of endometrial cancer and prostate cancer.

Some conclude that the benefits outweigh the risks, even with bleeding, in those at average risk. Others are unclear if the benefits are greater than the risk. Given this uncertainty, the 2007 United States Preventive Services Task Force (USPSTF) guidelines on this topic recommended against the use of aspirin for prevention of CRC in people with average risk. Nine years later however, the USPSTF issued a grade B recommendation for the use of low-dose aspirin (75 to 100 mg/day) "for the primary prevention of CVD [cardiovascular disease] and CRC in adults 50 to 59 years of age who have a 10% or greater 10-year CVD risk, are not at increased risk for bleeding, have a life expectancy of at least 10 years, and are willing to take low-dose aspirin daily for at least 10 years".

A meta-analysis through 2019 said that there was an association between taking aspirin and a lower risk of cancer of the colorectum, esophagus, and stomach.

In 2021, the United States Preventive Services Task Force raised questions about the use of aspirin in cancer prevention. It notes the results of the 2018 ASPREE (Aspirin in Reducing Events in the Elderly) Trial, in which the risk of cancer-related death was higher in the aspirin-treated group than in the placebo group.

In 2025, a group of scientists at the University of Cambridge found that aspirin stimulates the immune system to reduce cancer metastasis. They found that a protein called ARHGEF1 suppresses T cells, which are required for attacking metastatic cancer cells. Aspirin appeared to counteract this suppression by targeting a clotting factor called thromboxane A2 (TXA2), which activates ARHGEF1, thus preventing it from suppressing the T cells. The researchers called the discovery a "Eureka moment". It was reported that the findings could lead to a more targeted use for aspirin in cancer research. It was also said that self-medicating with aspirin should not be done yet due to its potential side effects until clinical trials are held. In an early foundational experiment, Gasic and co-workers demonstrated that mice given aspirin in their drinking water developed significantly fewer lung metastases compared with untreated controls. Recently, in a 2025 NEJM paper, Yang and colleagues offer a mechanism through which daily low-dose aspirin may inhibit metastatic spread.

=== Psychiatry ===
Aspirin, along with several other agents with anti-inflammatory properties, has been repurposed as an add-on treatment for depressive episodes in subjects with bipolar disorder in light of the possible role of inflammation in the pathogenesis of severe mental disorders. A 2022 systematic review concluded that aspirin exposure reduced the risk of depression in a pooled cohort of three studies (HR 0.624, 95% CI: 0.0503, 1.198, P=0.033). However, further high-quality, longer-duration, double-blind randomized controlled trials (RCTs) are needed to determine whether aspirin is an effective add-on treatment for bipolar depression. Thus, notwithstanding the biological rationale, the clinical perspectives of aspirin and anti-inflammatory agents in the treatment of bipolar depression remain uncertain.

Although cohort and longitudinal studies have shown that low-dose aspirin has a greater likelihood of reducing the incidence of dementia, numerous randomized controlled trials have not validated this. Some researchers have speculated that the anti-inflammatory effects of aspirin may be beneficial for schizophrenia. Small trials have been conducted, but evidence remains lacking.

=== Other uses ===
Aspirin is a first-line treatment for the fever and joint-pain symptoms of acute rheumatic fever. The therapy often lasts for one to two weeks, and is rarely indicated for longer periods. After fever and pain have subsided, the aspirin is no longer necessary, since it does not decrease the incidence of heart complications and residual rheumatic heart disease. Naproxen has been shown to be as effective as aspirin and less toxic, but due to the limited clinical experience, naproxen is recommended only as a second-line treatment.

Along with rheumatic fever, Kawasaki disease remains one of the few indications for aspirin use in children in spite of a lack of high quality evidence for its effectiveness. Low-dose aspirin supplementation has moderate benefits when used for prevention of pre-eclampsia. This benefit is greater when started in early pregnancy. Aspirin has also demonstrated anti-tumoral effects, via inhibition of the PTTG1 gene, which is often overexpressed in tumors.

=== Resistance ===
For some people, aspirin does not have as strong an effect on platelets as it does for others, an effect known as aspirin resistance or insensitivity. One study has suggested women are more likely to be resistant than men, and a different, aggregate study of 2,930 people found 28% were resistant. A study in 100 Italian people found, of the apparent 31% aspirin-resistant subjects, only 5% were truly resistant, and the others were noncompliant. Another study of 400 healthy volunteers found no subjects who were truly resistant, but some had "pseudoresistance, reflecting delayed and reduced drug absorption".

Meta-analyses and systematic reviews have concluded that laboratory-confirmed aspirin resistance is associated with increased rates of adverse cardiovascular and neurovascular outcomes. Although the majority of research conducted has surrounded cardiovascular and neurovascular, there is emerging research into the risk of aspirin resistance after orthopaedic surgery where aspirin is used for venous thromboembolism prophylaxis. Aspirin resistance in orthopaedic surgery, specifically after total hip and knee arthroplasties, is of interest as risk factors for aspirin resistance are also risk factors for venous thromboembolisms and osteoarthritis; the sequelae of requiring a total hip or knee arthroplasty. Some of these risk factors include obesity, advancing age, diabetes mellitus, dyslipidemia, and inflammatory diseases.

== Dosages ==
Adult aspirin tablets are produced in standardised sizes, which vary slightly from country to country, for example 300 mg in Britain and 325 mg in the United States. Smaller doses are based on these standards, e.g., 75 mg and 81 mg tablets. The 81 mg tablets are commonly called "baby aspirin" or "baby-strength", because they were originally – but no longer – intended to be administered to infants and children. No medical significance occurs due to the slight difference in dosage between the 75 mg and the 81 mg tablets. The dose required for benefit appears to depend on a person's weight. For those weighing less than 70 kilograms (154 lb), low dose is effective for preventing cardiovascular disease; for patients above this weight, higher doses are required.

In general, for adults, doses are taken four times a day for fever or arthritis, with doses near the maximal daily dose used historically for the treatment of rheumatic fever. For the prevention of myocardial infarction (MI) in someone with documented or suspected coronary artery disease, much lower doses are taken once daily.

April 2022 recommendations from the United States Preventive Services Task Force (USPSTF) states that for adults aged 40 to 59 years with a 10% or greater 10-year risk of cardiovascular disease (CVD), the decision to initiate low-dose aspirin for primary prevention should be individualized, as the net benefit is small and must be balanced against bleeding risk. For adults aged 60 years or older, the USPSTF recommends against starting low-dose aspirin for primary prevention of CVD, as potential harms outweigh the benefits. These recommendations apply to adults without established CVD or increased bleeding risk, and emphasize shared decision-making between patients and clinicians. Compared to the 2009 update, the 2022 update narrows the eligible population, raises the threshold for benefit, and places greater importance on bleeding risks, especially in older adults.

The WHI study of postmenopausal women found that aspirin resulted in a 25% lower risk of death from cardiovascular disease and a 14% lower risk of death from any cause, though there was no significant difference between 81 mg and 325 mg aspirin doses. The 2021 ADAPTABLE study also showed no significant difference in cardiovascular events or major bleeding between 81 mg and 325 mg doses of aspirin in patients (both men and women) with established cardiovascular disease.

Low-dose aspirin use was also associated with a trend toward lower risk of cardiovascular events, and lower aspirin doses (75 or 81 mg/day) may optimize efficacy and safety for people requiring aspirin for long-term prevention.

In children with Kawasaki disease, aspirin is taken at dosages based on body weight, initially four times a day for up to two weeks and then at a lower dose once daily for a further six to eight weeks.

== Adverse effects ==
Main side effects of aspirin

In October 2020, the US Food and Drug Administration (FDA) required the prescribing information to be updated for all nonsteroidal anti-inflammatory medications to describe the risk of kidney problems in unborn babies that result in low amniotic fluid. They recommend avoiding NSAIDs in pregnant women at 20 weeks or later in pregnancy. One exception to the recommendation is the use of low-dose 81 mg aspirin at any point in pregnancy under the direction of a health care professional.

=== Contraindications ===
Aspirin should not be taken by people who are allergic to ibuprofen or naproxen, or who have salicylate intolerance or a more generalized drug intolerance to NSAIDs, and caution should be exercised in those with asthma or NSAID-precipitated bronchospasm. Owing to its effect on the stomach lining, manufacturers recommend people with peptic ulcers, mild diabetes, or gastritis seek medical advice before using aspirin. Even if none of these conditions is present, the risk of stomach bleeding is still increased when aspirin is taken with alcohol or warfarin. People with hemophilia or other bleeding tendencies should not take aspirin or other salicylates. Aspirin is known to cause hemolytic anemia in people who have the genetic disease glucose-6-phosphate dehydrogenase deficiency, particularly in large doses and depending on the severity of the disease. Use of aspirin during dengue fever is not recommended owing to increased bleeding tendency. Aspirin taken at doses of ≤325 mg and ≤100 mg per day for ≥2 days can increase the odds of suffering a gout attack by 81% and 91% respectively. This effect may potentially be worsened by high purine diets, diuretics, and kidney disease, but is eliminated by the urate lowering drug allopurinol. Daily low dose aspirin does not appear to worsen kidney function. Aspirin may reduce cardiovascular risk in those without established cardiovascular disease in people with moderate CKD, without significantly increasing the risk of bleeding. Aspirin should not be given to children or adolescents under the age of 16 to control cold or influenza symptoms, as this has been linked with Reye syndrome.

=== Gastrointestinal ===
Aspirin increases the risk of upper gastrointestinal bleeding. Enteric coating on aspirin may be used in manufacturing to prevent release of aspirin into the stomach to reduce gastric harm, but enteric coating does not reduce gastrointestinal bleeding risk. Enteric-coated aspirin may not be as effective at reducing blood clot risk. Combining aspirin with other NSAIDs has been shown to further increase the risk of gastrointestinal bleeding. Using aspirin in combination with clopidogrel or warfarin also increases the risk of upper gastrointestinal bleeding.

The blockade of COX-1 by aspirin apparently results in the upregulation of COX-2 as part of a gastric defense. There is no clear evidence that simultaneous use of a COX-2 inhibitor with aspirin may increase the risk of gastrointestinal injury.

"Buffering" is an additional method used with the intent to mitigate gastrointestinal bleeding, such as by preventing aspirin from concentrating in the walls of the stomach, although the benefits of buffered aspirin are disputed. Almost any buffering agent used in antacids can be used; Bufferin, for example, uses magnesium oxide. Other preparations use calcium carbonate. Gas-forming agents in effervescent tablet and powder formulations can also double as a buffering agent, one example being sodium bicarbonate, used in Alka-Seltzer.

Taking vitamin C with aspirin has been investigated as a method of protecting the stomach lining. In trials, vitamin C-releasing aspirin (ASA-VitC) or a buffered aspirin formulation containing vitamin C was found to cause less stomach damage than aspirin alone.

=== Retinal vein occlusion ===
It is a widespread habit among eye specialists (ophthalmologists) to prescribe aspirin as an add-on medication for patients with retinal vein occlusion (RVO), such as central retinal vein occlusion (CRVO) and branch retinal vein occlusion (BRVO). The reason for this widespread use is the evidence of its proven effectiveness in major systemic venous thrombotic disorders, and it has been assumed that may be similarly beneficial in various types of retinal vein occlusion.

However, a large-scale investigation based on data of nearly 700 patients showed "that aspirin or other antiplatelet aggregating agents or anticoagulants adversely influence the visual outcome in patients with CRVO and hemi-CRVO, without any evidence of protective or beneficial effect". Several expert groups, including the Royal College of Ophthalmologists, recommended against the use of antithrombotic drugs (incl. aspirin) for patients with RVO.

=== Central effects ===
Large doses of salicylate, a metabolite of aspirin, cause temporary tinnitus (ringing in the ears) based on experiments in rats, as the action on arachidonic acid and NMDA receptors cascade.

=== Reye syndrome ===
Reye syndrome, a rare but severe illness characterized by acute encephalopathy and fatty liver, can occur when children or adolescents are given aspirin for a fever or other illness or infection. From 1981 to 1997, 1207 cases of Reye syndrome in people younger than 18 were reported to the US Centers for Disease Control and Prevention (CDC). Of these, 93% reported being ill in the three weeks preceding the onset of Reye syndrome, most commonly with a respiratory infection, chickenpox, or diarrhea. Salicylates were detectable in 81.9% of children for whom test results were reported. After the association between Reye syndrome and aspirin was reported, and safety measures to prevent it (including a Surgeon General's warning, and changes to the prescribing information of aspirin-containing drugs) were implemented, aspirin taken by children declined considerably in the United States, as did the number of reported cases of Reye syndrome; a similar decline was found in the United Kingdom after warnings against pediatric aspirin use were issued. The US Food and Drug Administration recommends aspirin (or aspirin-containing products) should not be given to anyone under the age of 12 who has a fever, and the UK National Health Service recommends children who are under 16 years of age should not be given aspirin, except on the advice of a doctor.

=== Skin ===
For a small number of people, taking aspirin can result in symptoms including hives, swelling, and headache. Aspirin can exacerbate symptoms among those with chronic hives, or create acute symptoms of hives. These responses can be due to allergic reactions to aspirin, or more often due to its effect of inhibiting the COX-1 enzyme. Skin reactions may also tie to systemic contraindications, seen with NSAID-precipitated bronchospasm, or those with atopy.

Aspirin and other NSAIDs, such as ibuprofen, may delay the healing of skin wounds. Earlier findings from two small, low-quality trials suggested a benefit with aspirin (alongside compression therapy) on venous leg ulcer healing time and leg ulcer size, however, larger, more recent studies of higher quality have been unable to corroborate these outcomes.

=== Other adverse effects ===
Aspirin can induce swelling of skin tissues in some people. In one study, angioedema appeared one to six hours after ingesting aspirin in some of the people. However, when the aspirin was taken alone, it did not cause angioedema in these people; the aspirin had been taken in combination with another NSAID-induced drug when angioedema appeared.

Aspirin causes an increased risk of cerebral microbleeds, having the appearance on MRI scans of 5 to 10 mm or smaller, hypointense (dark holes) patches.

A study of a group with a mean dosage of aspirin of 270 mg per day estimated an average absolute risk increase in intracerebral hemorrhage (ICH) of 12 events per 10,000 persons. In comparison, the estimated absolute risk reduction in myocardial infarction was 137 events per 10,000 persons, and a reduction of 39 events per 10,000 persons in ischemic stroke. In cases where ICH already has occurred, aspirin use results in higher mortality, with a dose of about 250 mg per day resulting in a relative risk of death within three months after the ICH around 2.5 (95% confidence interval 1.3 to 4.6).

Aspirin and other NSAIDs can cause abnormally high blood levels of potassium by inducing a hyporeninemic hypoaldosteronism state via inhibition of prostaglandin synthesis; however, these agents do not typically cause hyperkalemia by themselves in the setting of normal renal function and euvolemic state.

Use of low-dose aspirin before a surgical procedure has been associated with an increased risk of bleeding events in some patients, however, ceasing aspirin prior to surgery has also been associated with an increase in major adverse cardiac events. An analysis of multiple studies found a three-fold increase in adverse events such as myocardial infarction in patients who ceased aspirin prior to surgery. The analysis found that the risk is dependent on the type of surgery being performed and the patient indication for aspirin use.

In July 2015, the US Food and Drug Administration (FDA) strengthened warnings of increased heart attack and stroke risk associated with nonsteroidal anti-inflammatory drugs (NSAID). Aspirin is an NSAID but is not affected by the revised warnings.

=== Overdose ===
Symptoms of aspirin overdose

Aspirin overdose can be acute or chronic. In acute poisoning, a single large dose is taken; in chronic poisoning, higher than normal doses are taken over a period of time. Acute overdose has a mortality rate of 2%. Chronic overdose is more commonly lethal, with a mortality rate of 25%; chronic overdose may be especially severe in children. Toxicity is managed with a number of potential treatments, including activated charcoal, intravenous dextrose and normal saline, sodium bicarbonate, and dialysis. The diagnosis of poisoning usually involves measurement of plasma salicylate, the active metabolite of aspirin, by automated spectrophotometric methods. Plasma salicylate levels in general range from 30 to 100 mg/L after usual therapeutic doses, 50–300 mg/L in people taking high doses and 700–1400 mg/L following acute overdose. Salicylate is also produced as a result of exposure to bismuth subsalicylate, methyl salicylate, and sodium salicylate.

=== Interactions ===
Aspirin is known to interact with other drugs. For example, acetazolamide and ammonium chloride are known to enhance the intoxicating effect of salicylates, and alcohol also increases the gastrointestinal bleeding associated with these types of drugs. Aspirin is known to displace a number of drugs from protein-binding sites in the blood, including the antidiabetic drugs tolbutamide and chlorpropamide, warfarin, methotrexate, phenytoin, probenecid, valproic acid (as well as interfering with beta oxidation, an important part of valproate metabolism), and other NSAIDs. Corticosteroids may also reduce the concentration of aspirin. Other NSAIDs, such as ibuprofen and naproxen, may reduce the antiplatelet effect of aspirin. Although limited evidence suggests this may not result in a reduced cardioprotective effect of aspirin. Analgesic doses of aspirin decrease sodium loss induced by spironolactone in the urine, however this does not reduce the antihypertensive effects of spironolactone. Furthermore, antiplatelet doses of aspirin are deemed too small to produce an interaction with spironolactone. Aspirin is known to compete with penicillin G for renal tubular secretion. Aspirin may also inhibit the absorption of vitamin C.

== Research ==
The ISIS-2 trial demonstrated that aspirin at doses of 160 mg daily for one month, decreased the mortality by 21% of participants with a suspected myocardial infarction in the first five weeks. A single daily dose of 324 mg of aspirin for 12 weeks has a highly protective effect against acute myocardial infarction and death in men with unstable angina.

Aspirin has been repurposed as an add-on treatment for depressive episodes in subjects with bipolar disorder. However, meta-analytic evidence is based on very few studies and does not suggest any efficacy of aspirin in the treatment of bipolar depression. Thus, notwithstanding the biological rationale, the clinical perspectives of aspirin and anti-inflammatory agents in the treatment of bipolar depression remain uncertain.

Several studies investigated the anti-infective properties of aspirin for bacterial, viral and parasitic infections. Aspirin was demonstrated to limit platelet activation induced by Staphylococcus aureus and Enterococcus faecalis and to reduce streptococcal adhesion to heart valves. In patients with tuberculous meningitis, the addition of aspirin reduced the risk of new cerebral infarction [RR = 0.52 (0.29-0.92)]. A role of aspirin on bacterial and fungal biofilm is also being supported by growing evidence.

Evidence from observational studies was conflicting on the effect of aspirin in breast cancer prevention; a randomized controlled trial showed that aspirin had no significant effect in reducing breast cancer, thus further studies are needed to clarify the effect of aspirin in cancer prevention.

There are anecdotal reports that aspirin can improve the growth and resistance of plants, though most research has involved salicylic acid instead of aspirin.

== Veterinary medicine ==
Aspirin is sometimes used in veterinary medicine as an anticoagulant or to relieve pain associated with musculoskeletal inflammation or osteoarthritis. Aspirin should be given to animals only under the direct supervision of a veterinarian, as adverse effects—including gastrointestinal issues—are common. An aspirin overdose in any species may result in salicylate poisoning, characterized by hemorrhaging, seizures, coma, and even death.

Dogs are better able to tolerate aspirin than cats are. Cats metabolize aspirin slowly because they lack the glucuronide conjugates that aid in the excretion of aspirin, making it potentially toxic if dosing is not spaced out properly. No clinical signs of toxicosis occurred when cats were given 25 mg/kg of aspirin every 48 hours for 4 weeks, but the recommended dose for relief of pain and fever and for treating blood clotting diseases in cats is 10 mg/kg every 48 hours to allow for metabolization.
