= Alka-Seltzer =

Effervescent antacid and pain reliever

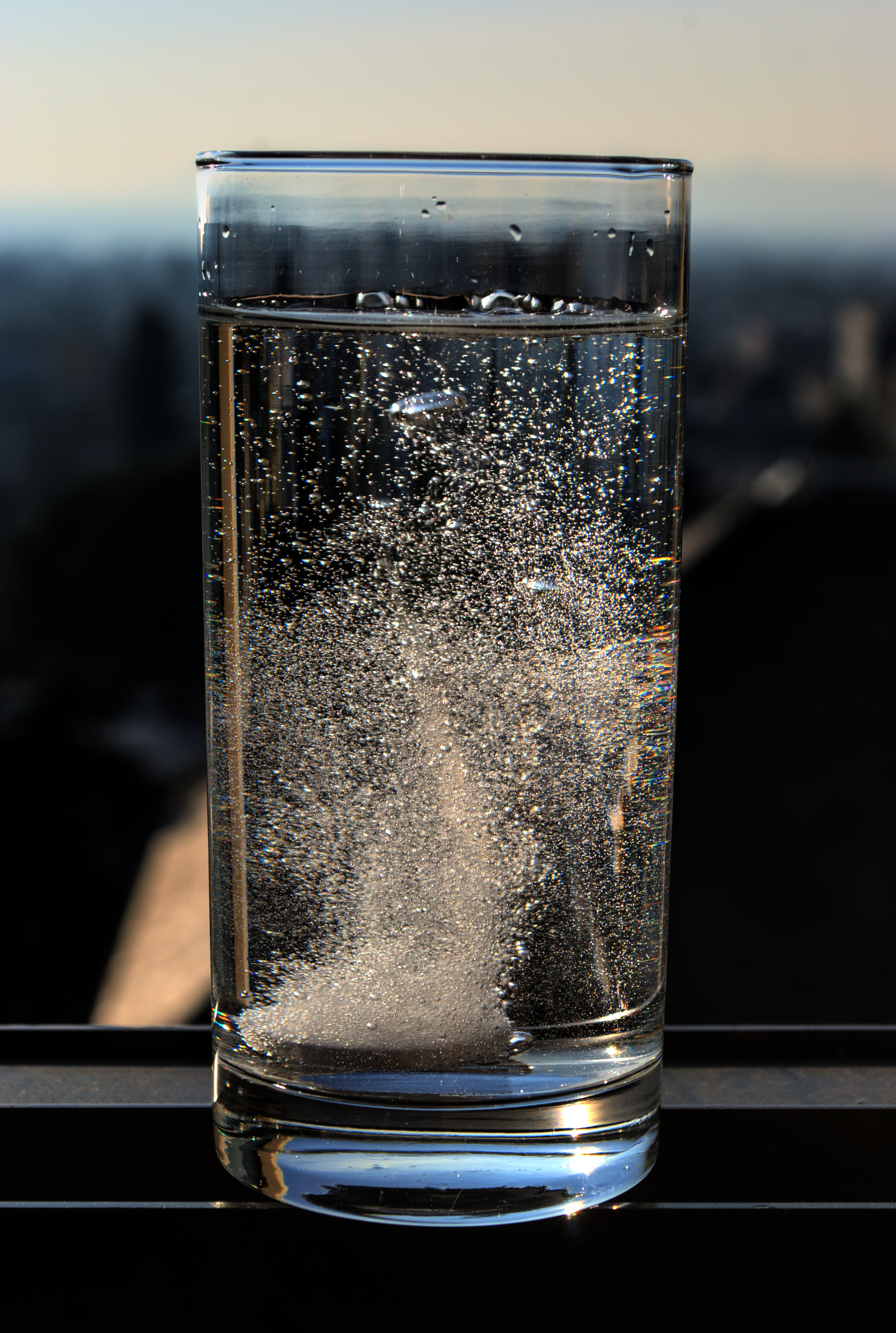
- An Alka-Seltzer tablet dissolving at the bottom of a glass of water
- Product type: Antacid, aspirin, NSAID, tablets, liquid gels, fruit chews
- Current owner: Bayer (since 1978)
- Country: United States
- Introduced: 1931; 95 years ago
- Markets: Worldwide
- Previous owners: Miles Laboratories
- Tagline: "Plop, plop, fizz, fizz, oh what a relief it is"
- Website: alkaseltzer.com

Alka-Seltzer is an effervescent antacid and pain reliever owned by Bayer since 1978. It contains three active ingredients: aspirin (acetylsalicylic acid or ASA), sodium bicarbonate (also known as baking soda), and anhydrous citric acid. The aspirin is a pain reliever and anti-inflammatory, while the sodium bicarbonate is an antacid. When an Alka-Seltzer tablet is dissolved in water, the citric acid and sodium bicarbonate react to form effervescence.

Alka-Seltzer was developed by head chemist Maurice Treneer and is marketed for relief of minor aches, pains, inflammation, fever, headache, heartburn, stomach ache, indigestion, acid reflux, and hangovers while neutralizing excess stomach acid. It was launched in 1931.

Its sister product, Alka-Seltzer Plus, treats cold and flu symptoms. A wide variety of formulas, many using acetaminophen (paracetamol) instead of aspirin, are available under the sister brand.

The product can be used in amateur chemistry lessons as an example of an endothermic reaction.

== Product information ==
Alka-Seltzer is a combination of sodium bicarbonate, aspirin, and anhydrous citric acid used for the relief of heartburn, acid indigestion, and stomach aches.

Alka-Seltzer is sold in foil packets, each containing two tablets. Prior to 1984, it was also available stacked in cylindrical glass bottles. It is available in many different flavors.

It was once marketed as a cure-all; at one time, its ads even suggested taking it for "the blahs". Subsequent promotion has taken into consideration that aspirin is a drug that is not tolerated by everyone, and the product is no longer advertised in this fashion.

Alka-Seltzer marketed as an antacid no longer contains aspirin (ASA). The original effervescent formula has aspirin as its main active ingredient, and is marketed for pain relief.

=== Chemistry of the effervescence ===
Though important to the overall effect of the medication, the aspirin (acetylsalicylic acid) is not required to produce the effervescent action of Alka-Seltzer; the effervescence is produced by the baking soda (sodium bicarbonate) and citric acid reacting to form sodium citrate and carbon dioxide gas.

C_{6}H_{8}O_{7}(aq)	+	3NaHCO_{3}(aq)	→	3H_{2}O(l)	+	3CO_{2}(g)	+	Na_{3}C_{6}H_{5}O_{7}(aq)
citric acid	+	sodium bicarbonate	→	water	+	Carbon dioxide	+	sodium citrate

== Marketing ==
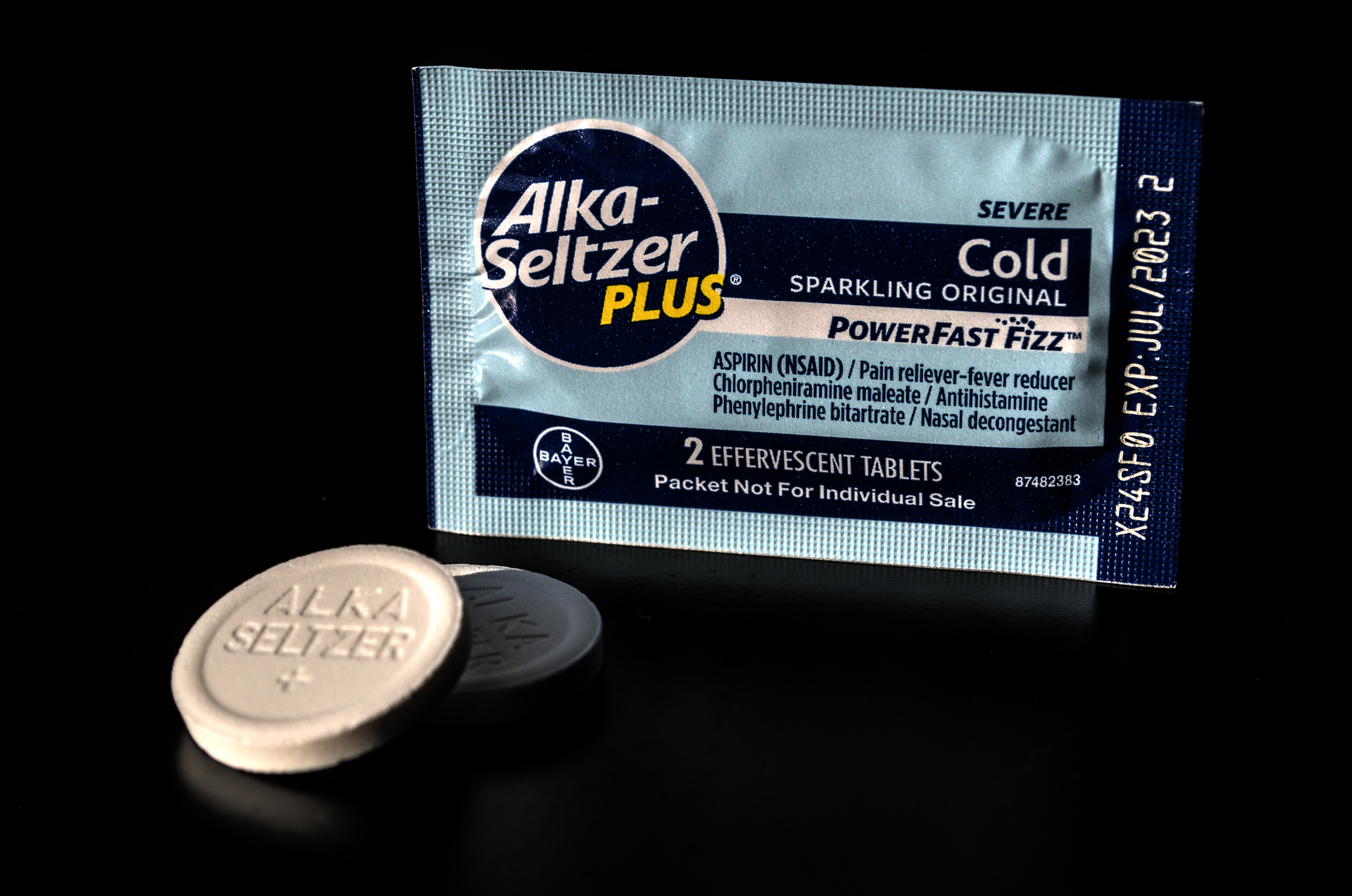
Two Alka-Seltzer Plus tablets next to an Alka-Seltzer Plus packet

The product has been extensively advertised since its launch in the United States. It was originally marketed by the Dr. Miles Medicine Company, who also helped direct its development.

=== History ===
Alka-Seltzer had their own self-endorsed radio shows, including Alka-Seltzer Comedy Star of Hollywood, National Barn Dance, and Alka-Seltzer Time.

In 1951, Alka-Seltzer introduced “Speedy.” Voiced by Dick Beals, the character, who appeared in over 200 TV commercials between 1954 and 1964, was conceived by creative directors Bob Watkins and Chuck Tennant of the Wade Advertising agency and designed by illustrator Wally Wood. His name was chosen by sales manager Perry L. Shupert to align with that year's promotional theme, "Speedy Relief.” Alka-Seltzer briefly brought Speedy back into their marketing in 2008, starring in an ad campaign directed by David Hulin.

Paul Margulies created the famous "Plop, plop, fizz, fizz" (“Plink, plink, fizz” in the United Kingdom) ad campaign when he worked as a Madison Avenue ad executive. The ubiquitous jingle was composed by Tom Dawes, a former member of The Cyrkle. Sammy Davis Jr. recorded two versions of the "Plop Plop Fizz Fizz" jingle in 1978, one of which (the "big band" version) was featured on a television commercial.

In the early 1960s, a commercial showing two tablets dropping into a glass of water instead of one tablet caused sales to double.

Alka-Seltzer TV ads from the 1950s and 1960s in the US were among the most popular of the 20th century, ranking number 13, according to Advertising Age. To increase sales in a relatively flat business, Bayer revived several of the vintage spots.

George Raft starred in the 1969 Alka-Seltzer commercial "The Unfinished Lunch". It consisted of Raft incarcerated in a prison lunchroom. He takes a bite of the prison food and recoils. Suddenly he bangs his cup on the steel table. It ripples throughout the room. He starts intoning "Alka-Seltzer, Alka-Seltzer..." Soon, the other hundreds of inmates do the same. The commercial became so popular that several weeks later, Raft appeared as a guest on The Tonight Show Starring Johnny Carson. Raft told Carson that it took more than 7 hours to tape the 30-second commercial. Raft was enraged by the end of the day, thus making his inmate portrayal that much more convincing for the final editing. The film crew gave Raft his crumpled tin cup, which he showed to Carson and the audience.

An animated mid-1960s commercial, animated by R. O. Blechman, shows a man and his own stomach sitting opposite each other in chairs, having an argument moderated by their therapist in a voiceover. The stomach (voiced by Gene Wilder) accuses the man of purposely trying to irritate it. The man accuses his stomach of complaining too much about the foods he likes. The therapist suggests Alka-Seltzer and that the two must take care of each other. The closing words are of the stomach saying to the man: "Well, I'll try — if you will."

Alka-Seltzer had a series of commercials during the mid-1960s that used a song called "No Matter What Shape (Your Stomach's In)". A different version was recorded by The T-Bones and was released as a single, which became a hit in 1966. The ads featured only the midsections (no faces) of people of all shapes and sizes. A clip of the ad can be seen briefly in the 1988 motion picture The In Crowd, immediately before the movie's first live broadcast of the fictitious "Perry Parker's Dance Party."

In an Alka-Seltzer commercial from 1969, an actor named "Jack" (played by Jack Somack) in a commercial for the fictional product "Magadini's Meatballs" has to eat a meatball from a plate handed to him by an actress (Fran Lopate). Jack's reaction to tasting the meatball is to then say "Mamma mia, that's-a spicy meat-a ball-a!" in an ersatz Italian accent. Take after take is ruined by some comedic trial or another (comedian Ronny Graham dropping the clapperboard). By the commercial's end, Jack has eaten so many meatballs that it's "Alka-Seltzer to the rescue." With his stomach settled, Jack does a perfect take, except that the oven door falls off. The director (off-camera) sighs and says, "OK, let's break for lunch." The advertisement drew the ire of Joseph Colombo’s organization, the Italian-American Civil Rights League. While reportedly the manufacturer pulled the ad from circulation due to the League's pressure, the decision to stop using it was made prior to the League's objection for other reasons.

A 1982 commercial shows a newlywed couple in the bedroom after the woman (played by Alice Playten) has finished serving her husband (played by Terry Kiser) a giant dumpling; the implication is that her cooking skills are severely lacking. She lies on the bed in delusional triumph. She offers her beleaguered husband a heart-shaped meatloaf; he disappears to take some Alka-Seltzer. When she hears the fizzy noise coming from the bathroom, he quickly covers the glass of dissolving Alka-Seltzer as she wonders aloud if it is raining. Just when he has recovered his well-being, he hears her misreading recipes for dinner the next night: "Marshmallowed meatballs," "sweet and sour snails," and "pouched (actually poached) oysters". He returns to the bathroom for more Alka-Seltzer as the narrator said, "what love doesn't conquer, Alka-Seltzer will."

In 1972, an actor (Milt Moss) spent the commercial moaning, "I can't believe I ate that who-o-o-o-o-ole thing" while his wife (Lynn Whinic) made sarcastic comments and finally advised him to take some Alka-Seltzer. The catchphrase, Howie Cohen told the Los Angeles Times, was inspired when he ate too much of the food at a London commercial shoot because "I am a nice Jewish kid from the Bronx, so I ate everything," and when he told his wife "I can't believe I ate the whole thing", she said, "There's your next Alka-Seltzer commercial." In 2005, this ad was also remade, featuring Peter Boyle and Doris Roberts from the 1996–2005 TV sitcom Everybody Loves Raymond.

A 1971 commercial featured another catch-phrase from Cohen (along with Bob Pasqualina), repeating the phrase "Try it, you'll like it," in a lighthearted voice, followed with a dramatic "So I tried it... thought I was gonna DIE." It was remade with Kathy Griffin in 2006.

In 2009, the brand was featured in television commercials supporting the United States Ski Team that included alpine skier Lindsey Vonn and Nordic combined skier Bill Demong. Miniature figures of the Speedy mascot were shown with each. Alka-Seltzer products are sold in nighttime and daytime, or non-drowsy, formulas. In 2022, the non-drowsy claims were questioned.

== See also ==
- Carbonated water
- Brioschi
- Aspirin
- Bromo-Seltzer
