= Nicholas Wald =

British medical academic

Professor Sir Nicholas Wald FRS FRCP FFPH FRCOG FRSB FMedSci

Professor of Preventive Medicine, University College London
- Incumbent
- Assumed office 2019

Professor of Environmental and Preventative Medicine, Queen Mary College, London/Queen Mary and Westfield College, London/Queen Mary University of London
- In office 1983–2019

Personal details
- Born: 31 May 1944 (age 81)
- Occupation: Medical researcher

Sir Nicholas John Wald (born 31 May 1944) is a British medical academic who is honorary professor of preventive medicine, University College London, honorary professor, Population Health Research Institute, St George's, University of London, visiting professor, University of Oxford, and honorary consultant and adjunct professor, Brown University, Rhode Island. He was professor of environmental and preventive medicine from 1983 to 2019 at Barts and The London School of Medicine and Dentistry, where he was co-founder and director of the Wolfson Institute of Preventive Medicine.

In the 1970s, Wald showed that fetal neural tube defects could be detected by measuring alpha-fetoprotein in the pregnant woman's blood. He was the innovator of the “MoM”, or multiple of the median, a measure of the level of screening markers. He, with colleagues, first described the Triple test (1988), Combined test (1998), Quad test (2003), Integrated test (1999) and Reflex DNA test (2015).

In 1986 Wald showed that environmental tobacco smoke was a cause of lung cancer and was a member of the US National Academy of Sciences Committee – the first public body that reached this conclusion. In 2003, with Professor Malcolm Law, he showed that environmental tobacco smoke also causes cardiovascular disease.

In 1991 Wald showed that folic acid supplementation prevented most cases of neural tube defects. In 1999, together with Law, he invented the polypill.

He received, in 2000, the Joseph P. Kennedy Jr. Foundation Award, was elected a Fellow of the Royal Society (FRS) in 2004, and knighted in the 2008 Birthday Honours for services to preventive medicine. In 2019 he was elected a member of the US National Academy of Medicine.
