= Polycap =

Combination drug

Polycap is a specific five-in-one fixed dose combination polypill created by Cadila Pharmaceuticals Limited of Ahmedabad, India that combines moderate levels of five different medications in a single, one-a-day pill aimed at reducing/preventing heart attacks and strokes.

Polycap containing three generic blood pressure medications and a statin dramatically reduces the risk of heart-related illness in people with no prior history of heart problems, according to the results of a recent clinical trial presented at the American Heart Association's Scientific Sessions 2020.

This result comes as part of the International Polycap Study (TIPS)-3, a randomized, placebo-controlled trial to test the effectiveness of this fixed-dose combination therapy. The study investigators also examined the impact of aspirin alone and in combination with the polypill. When taken on its own, Polycap reduces by 20% the risk of heart attack, stroke, procedures to reopen clogged arteries and other heart disease, the researchers reported. The Polycap combined with daily low-dose aspirin is even more effective, reducing heart health problems by up to 40%. The study results were published online in The New England Journal of Medicine.

Polycap combines 100 milligrams of aspirin, with simvastatin (a generic version of Zocor, the cholesterol-lowering statin; 20 mg) and low doses of three blood pressure medications, beta blocker atenolol (50 mg), ACE inhibitor ramipril (5 mg) and diuretic hydrochlorothiazide (12.5 mg). And despite containing multiple drugs, the pill has a fairly small size which can facilitate swallowing.

== The International Polycap Study - 3 (TIPS-3) ==
The International Polycap Study 3 (TIPS-3) was a 2x2x2 factorial design study presented in two parts during the late-breaking clinical trial session. In TIPS-3, investigators randomized 5713 participants across 9 countries to determine if a fixed-dose combination tablet reduced the risk of major cardiovascular outcomes in a primary prevention population. As part of the factorial design, the additional interventions included aspirin alone compared with placebo as well as polypill plus aspirin compared with double placebo.

To be included in the study, patients had to be at intermediate risk for myocardial infarction, stroke, and cardiovascular death. The participants’ average age was 64 years. Men 50 years and older and women 55 years and older with an INTERHEART risk score ≥ 10 (or men and women 65 years and older with an INTERHEART risk score ≥ 5) were included in the international study. Roughly 53% of study participants were women. Mean LDL cholesterol level and systolic blood pressure at baseline were 121 mg/dL and 144.5 mm Hg, respectively. For the trial, participants were randomly assigned to one of four groups. They were asked to take one of the following daily: both the polypill and aspirin, the polypill alone, aspirin alone, or only a placebo. The top-enrolling countries were India, the Philippines, Columbia, and Bangladesh; Canada enrolled 131 patients.

Medications included in the polypill were atenolol, 100 mg; ramipril, 10 mg; hydrochlorothiazide, 25 mg; and simvastatin, 40 mg.

Only 4.4% of those who took the polypill alone had a heart attack, stroke, artery-reopening procedure or died of heart disease, compared to 5.5% who took the placebo. About 4.1% of those who took aspirin alone developed heart-related illness, compared to 4.7% of those with the placebo.

Combining a polypill with aspirin provided the best benefits, the study authors said. The polypill/aspirin combination reduced heart problems and deaths by 31%, the researchers discovered. People who continued to take the pill without interruption for about four years saw a 40% reduced risk of heart problems.

The trial included a follow-up period of 5 years. During which, participants were monitored for nonfatal myocardial infarctions, nonfatal strokes, heart failure, cardiac arrest, and cardiovascular death.

The study was 95% funded by charitable organizations like the Wellcome Trust UK, parent company Cadila Pharmaceuticals and other government agencies.

== The Indian Polycap Study (TIPS) ==
A study called The Indian Polycap Study (TIPS) was sponsored by Cadila Pharmaceuticals Limited, (where the drug development program was coordinated by JP Parswani, President, and Dr. Arun Maseeh, Vice-President Medical Affairs), and led by Dr. Salim Yusuf of McMaster University in Hamilton, Ontario, and Dr. Prem Pais of St. John's Medical College in Bangalore, India. The results of the randomized, controlled, double-blind study, reported in March 2009 at an American College of Cardiology conference and published online by The Lancet, documented the outcome of 2,000 individuals with an average age of 54 given the medication, all of whom had at least one heart disease risk factor: diabetes, hypercholesterolemia, hypertension, obesity or smoking. The study was registered with ClinicalTrials.gov, number NCT00443794.

During a 12-week treatment period, 400 of the study participants were given Polycap. The remainder were divided into eight groups of 200 who were given either individual components or groups of them. Three of the groups of 200 received only aspirin, simvastatin or thiazide respectively; Three groups received two of the three blood pressure medications; Another received all three blood pressure medications, while the last received all three combined with aspirin.

The individuals who were given Polycap saw their blood pressure drop from six to seven points for both their systolic and diastolic levels. These reductions in blood pressure could cut the risk of heart disease by 62% and of stroke by 48% based on the results of other studies that showed risk reductions from cutting blood pressure levels. The combined pill was almost as effective as the individual pills with no increase in side effects.

Generic versions of the five components cost $17 per month in the United States as of 2009. Estimates are that the combined dose would sell for far less while offering the psychological benefit of reducing the "pill burden" on patients taking multiple medications. Distribution would require approval by the U.S. Food and Drug Administration and other regulatory bodies worldwide. Details of the polycap data were widely reported in the popular media, including USA Today, The Guardian (UK), BBC, CBS Healthwatch, ABC News, India Today.

== Polycap PK Study ==
The Polycap (Cadila) has been found to be safe and effective for reducing multiple cardiovascular risk factors. Bioavailability of each component of PolycapTM and absence of their mutual interaction relative to single component reference formulations have been evaluated by a group of scientists led by Dr. Bhaswat Chakraborty.

Bioavailability of the components of the Polycap (aspirin, ramipril, simvastatin, atenolol and hydrochlorothiazide) when formulated as a single capsule was compared to identical capsules with each of its components administered separately in a five arm, randomized, single-dose, two-period, two-treatment, two-sequence, crossover trial with at least 2 week washout period in a total of 195 healthy humans. Plasma concentrations of each drug and where applicable its active metabolite were measured using validated LC-MS/MS and UPLC. Mean pharmacokinetic parameters and their standard deviations were computed for each analyte. Comparative bioavailability and absence of drug-drug interaction for each component were computed based on a point estimate of test/reference (T/R) ratio of geometric means falling within 80-125% for Cmax, AUC0-t and AUC0-∞.

The ratio of Cmax, AUC0-t and AUC0-∞ for Polycap and reference drugs was within 80-125% for atenolol, hydrochlorothiazide, ramipril, ramiprilat and dose normalized salicylic acid. However, for simvastatin the point estimate of Cmax, AUC0-t and AUC0-∞ for Ln-transformed data were significantly lower (~25%) and for its active metabolite, simvastatin acid, it was significantly higher (~60%). Thus, the increased bioavailability of active simvastatin acid compensated for the loss of bioavailability of simvastatin alone. There was no indication of kinetic drug-drug interaction in any of components.

== Sources ==
- Yusuf, S; Pais, P; Afzal, R; et al. (2009). "Effects of a polypill (Polycap) on risk factors in middle-aged individuals without cardiovascular disease (TIPS): A phase II, double-blind, randomised trial". The Lancet. 373 (9672): 1341–1351. doi:10.1016/S0140-6736(09)60611-5. PMID 19339045. S2CID 195683552.
- Cannon, Christopher P (2009). "Can the polypill save the world from heart disease?". The Lancet. 373 (9672): 1313–1314. doi:10.1016/S0140-6736(09)60652-8. PMID 19339044. S2CID 7874991.
- Patel, Anil; Shah, Tarang; Shah, Gaurang; Jha, Vijay; Ghosh, Chinmoy; Desai, Jagruti; Khamar, Bakulesh; Chakraborty, Bhaswat S (2010). "Preservation of Bioavailability of Ingredients and Lack of Drug-Drug Interactions in a Novel Five-Ingredient Polypill (Polycap™)". American Journal of Cardiovascular Drugs. 10 (2): 95–103. doi:10.2165/11532170-000000000-00000. PMID 20334446. S2CID 31754902.
