= AFPep =

Names
- IUPAC name Cyclo[L-asparaginyl-L-α-glutamyl-L-lysyl-L-threonyl-(4R)-4-hydroxy-L-prolyl-L-valyl-L-asparaginyl-(4R)-4-hydroxy-L-prolylglycyl]
- Other names cyclo(EKTOVNOGN); alpha fetoprotein peptide; AFP peptide

Identifiers
CAS Number	730937-78-7
3D model (JSmol)	Interactive image
- InChI: InChI=1S/C40H64N12O16/c1-17(2)31-38(66)48-24(13-28(43)57)39(67)51-15-19(54)10-25(51)36(64)44-14-29(58)45-23(12-27(42)56)35(63)47-22(7-8-30(59)60)33(61)46-21(6-4-5-9-41)34(62)50-32(18(3)53)40(68)52-16-20(55)11-26(52)37(65)49-31/h17-26,31-32,53-55H,4-16,41H2,1-3H3,(H2,42,56)(H2,43,57)(H,44,64)(H,45,58)(H,46,61)(H,47,63)(H,48,66)(H,49,65)(H,50,62)(H,59,60)/t18-,19-,20-,21+,22+,23+,24+,25+,26+,31+,32+/m1/s1 Key: JSHGNKOVKCGRTI-BUROXXGJSA-N
- SMILES: O=C1N2[C@](C(=O)N[C@@H]([C@H](C)C)C(=O)N[C@@H](CC(N)=O)C(=O)N3[C@@](C[C@@H](O)C3)(C(=O)NCC(=O)N[C@@H](CC(N)=O)C(=O)N[C@@H](CCC(O)=O)C(=O)N[C@@H](CCCCN)C(=O)N[C@]1([C@@H](C)O)[H])[H])(C[C@@H](O)C2)[H]

Properties
Chemical formula	C_{40}H_{64}N_{12}O_{16}
Molar mass	969.020 g·mol^{−1}
- Except where otherwise noted, data are given for materials in their standard state (at 25 °C [77 °F], 100 kPa). Infobox references

AFPep (alpha fetoprotein peptide) is an orally-active, cyclic, 9-amino acid, peptide with a molecular weight of 969 daltons and is derived from the anti-oncogenic active site (residues 472–479) of alpha fetoprotein (AFP). Using the standard amino acid abbreviations, AFPep has the sequence cyclo(EKTOVNOGN), where O is hydroxyproline. This peptide has been shown in experimental animal models to be efficacious in the prevention and treatment of ER+ breast cancer.

== Biological activity ==
=== Background ===
Multiple births by a woman are strongly associated with a lower risk of developing breast cancer later in her life. One of the contributing factors for this association appears to be the alpha fetoprotein (AFP) produced by the fetal liver, which crosses the placenta and enters into the maternal circulation. Pregnancy-associated protection from breast cancer is directly proportional to level of exposure to AFP. Furthermore, it has been demonstrated that tumor growth can be inhibited by AFP in animal models of breast cancer. It is speculated that AFP may induce apoptosis in pre-malignant breast tissue cells which would have later developed into malignancies.

=== Anti cancer effects ===
Through mimicking the effects of AFP, AFPep inhibits the proliferation of estrogen receptor-positive human breast cancer cells growing in culture. It is also able to inhibit the estrogen stimulated growth of human breast cancer cells growing as xenografts in immunodeficient mice. According to a recent study, AFPep prevents the development of carcinogen-induced breast cancer in an animal model. Hence AFPep may have utility for preventing or treating estrogen receptor-positive breast cancer.

=== Mechanism of action ===
AFPep inhibits estrogen-stimulated growth of immature mouse uterus and thus is antiestrogenic. In culture, AFPep inhibits the estrogen induced proliferation of T47D cells but has no effect on the basal growth. AFPep also inhibits phosphorylation of the estrogen receptor and activates the phosphorylation of p53.

AFPep has been shown to bind the heat shock protein Hsp72. Hsp72 together with Hsp90 form a heterocomplex with the estrogen receptor. Hence AFPep through interaction with Hsp72 controls the ligand binding and transcriptional activation of the estrogen receptor.

== Combination therapy with tamoxifen ==
AFPep increases the efficacy and decreases the toxicities of tamoxifen.

Tamoxifen has been a very effective drug for the treatment of estrogen receptor-positive breast cancer. But tamoxifen has certain toxicities and side effects such as uterine hyperplasia which can lead to endometrial cancer. Moreover, some breast cancers acquire resistance to tamoxifen during the course of treatment and few are totally resistant to it. It has been established that AFPep when used in combination with tamoxifen, reduces the uterine hyperplasia and increases the antitumour effects of tamoxifen. A rational combination of AFPep and tamoxifen may prove to be a better chemopreventive or chemotherapeutic approach against estrogen receptor-positive breast cancer.

== Route of administration ==
AFPep active whether administered intraperitoneally, subcutaneously or orally.
