= PolyIran =

Clinical trial

The PolyIran study is a pragmatic open-labeled randomized trial that was conducted within Golestan cohort study (GCS) on 31000 subjects in 305 villages of Golestan Province, northeastern Iran. The pill used in this study, "Polypill", has been successfully evaluated in a pilot study and consists of 4 components. It is estimated to decrease the death rate due to myocardial infarction and stroke by 30-53%. Participants were enrolled in the study during February 2011 and April 2013. The study directly evaluates the effect of Polypill tablets on cardiovascular death and hospitalizations compared to lifestyle modification during 5 years of follow-up; unlike most of the studies that only investigate the impact of Polypill on indirect surrogate markers of cardiovascular diseases such as blood pressure or lipid profile. The study includes three arms. The first and largest arm (24000 subjects) were just followed and received no particular care other than care provided by the governmental health system in Iran (usual care arm). The second arm (3500 subjects) received recommendations about a healthy lifestyle in face-to-face interviews and pamphlets, underwent blood pressure measurements in 6 months regular intervals, and were referred to secondary or tertiary medical centers for treatment upon necessity (minimal care arm). The third arm (another 3500 subjects) received Polypill once daily in addition to the care provided to the minimal care arm (Polypill arm). In case of a substantial decrease in mortality in Polypill arm at the end of the study, Polypill might have been offered to all individuals above 50 years old as a cheap preventive alternative for cardiovascular diseases.

== Results ==
The trial's primary findings were published in The Lancet in August 2019. Over five years of follow-up, major cardiovascular events occurred in 202 (5.9%) of 3,421 participants in the polypill group, compared with 301 (8.8%) of 3,417 participants in the minimal care group, corresponding to a relative risk reduction of about 34% and a number needed to treat of approximately 35. Medication adherence based on pill count was 80.5%, and the rate of adverse events did not differ significantly between the two groups. The benefit was greater among participants with adherence of at least 70%.

The authors concluded that a low-cost polypill could be considered as part of strategies to reduce cardiovascular disease burden among eligible adults, particularly in low-income and middle-income countries.
