= Polypill =

Drug with multiple pharmaceutical ingredients

A polypill or single pill combination (SPC) is a type of drug combination consisting of a single drug product in pill form (i.e., tablet or capsule) that combines multiple active pharmaceutical ingredients. The prefix "poly" means "multiple", referring to the multiplicity of distinct drugs in a given "pill". Precisely, a polypill contains at least 4 ingredients (fixed-dose combinations of 2 or 3 drugs are not polypills). A synonym is combopill. Polypills commonly target treatment or prevention of chronic conditions.

Polypills may be consumed by healthy people as a preventive medicine, and/or treating actual pathophysiological condition(s), the former typically involving lower dosages than the latter. Polypills reduce the number of tablets or capsules (generally orally administered), which in turn facilitates handling and administration of pharmaceuticals as well as easing the burden of managing multiple pills. The drugs in a given polypill are typically aimed at a single underlying condition (or group of related conditions). The term polypill was coined in the context of cardiovascular disease prevention, but gained broader acceptance, including for combinatorial drug products that predated the term.

Polypills can be custom-made for specific patients by a compounding pharmacy. Physicians in most jurisdictions have wide discretion to prescribe customized products containing unique drug-dosage combinations (and/or formulations thereof) specifically for individual patients.

== For treatment or management of disease ==
Polypills are a useful therapeutic tool for those afflicted with various diseases/conditions, by consolidating multiple medications into a single product and thereby simplifying medication administration for healthcare personnel as well as alleviating pill-burden for patients.

HIV, mental-health, transplant, and certain other patient groups are known for especially high pill-burdens (whether temporary or indefinite). Also, elderly patients in particular are likely to require several medications on a daily basis for managing multiple conditions, and they are also particularly susceptible to difficulties remembering or keeping track of their regimen.

=== Origin of multi-drug pill usage ===
Combinatorial drug products were proposed for treating diagnosed conditions long before they were proposed for preventive medicine, including "aspolol" (a combination of aspirin and atenolol) for those diagnosed with cardiovascular disease. Fixed-dose combination (FDC) products today are also common for treating other diseases, such as tuberculosis and HIV/AIDS.

=== Developments in polypill usage for disease therapy ===
==== Treating cardiovascular disease ====
One of the first recommended roles of a polypill was as a means of providing recommended medications to people with heart disease, stroke and other forms of cardiovascular disease. Most cardiovascular disease patients do not receive recommended medications long-term: the proportion of cardiovascular disease patients not receiving a statin, aspirin and blood pressure lowering medication long-term ranges from about 50% in high income countries to over 90% in low income countries. In 2001, a World Health Organization and The Wellcome Trust meeting of experts to discuss interventions for non-communicable diseases noted “the use of a single pill could well encourage patients to adhere to treatment as well as seriously reduce the cost of the drugs” A programme of research was outlined, including stability and bio-availability testing followed by assessment of short-term effects on blood pressure, cholesterol, platelet aggregation, safety and side effects. In 2002, the World Health Organization Annual Report outlined the substantial potential public health impact and cost-effectiveness of scaling up access to combination cardiovascular treatment and an editorial in The Lancet noted that a four component combination pill would reduce cardiovascular risk by about 75% among people with vascular disease.

==== Treating diabetes and metabolic syndrome ====
Polypills have been proposed for managing diabetes (and potentially for pre-diabetes).

Diabetes - particularly Type II diabetes - is a major cause of morbidity and mortality. Diabetes also contributes substantially to cardiovascular risk, yet some ingredients appropriate for a cardiovascular polypill may not be advisable for patients with diabetes (such as beta-blockers and thiazide diuretics). A polypill for diabetes could include a statin (to reduce LDL cholesterol and for their anti-inflammatory properties), an ACE inhibitor (for blood pressure control and to protect the kidneys), aspirin (for antiplatelet and anti-inflammatory properties), and metformin (a medication for diabetes that is also associated with weight loss).

==== Role of compounding pharmacy ====
As noted, not all polypills are mass-produced fixed-dose (FDC) drug products. Physicians in many countries have wide discretion to prescribe customized drug products containing unique drug-dosage combinations and/or formulations thereof specifically for individual patients, which can then be custom-produced in a compounding pharmacy. Some kinds or compositions of polypills or similar drug products are more amenable to custom-compounding than others, and most retail pharmacies no longer offer compounding services at all (although hospital pharmacies still commonly compound intravenous medications). While fewer pharmacists are trained and experienced in the relevant skills anymore, especially regarding oral dosage forms, such compounding pharmacies nevertheless can be found and utilized via mail-order (if not available locally) with sufficient notice and planning. Generally, if a customized drug product is produced for a specific patient in response to a prescription specifying said patient's drug(s)/dosage(s), it is not subject to regulatory approval (e.g., FDA in the US) but is instead regulated under the practice of pharmacy (governed at the state-level in the US).

Technologies are under development to facilitate production of customized polypills, such as for example by the use of ink-jet printing mechanisms to precisely deposit selected drug substance(s) onto sheets which can then be inserted into capsules (enabling "individualized dosing and automated fabrication of medicines containing multiple drugs," in addition to custom single-drug products). Similar technology can also be used to print tablets, more directly. Ink-jet or fluid-jet approaches require each drug substance to be dissolved in a liquid solvent, but they can be particularly conducive to custom formulation with various possible excipients (in addition to custom drug/dose selections).

== For preventive medicine ==
=== Origin of preventive medicine applications ===
Wald and Law had first proposed using a combination of well-known and inexpensive medications in one pill for protection against cardiovascular disease. They presented a statistical model which suggested widespread use of such a polypill could reduce mortality due to heart disease and strokes by up to 80%, while the drugs and their respective interactions are already fairly well known and understood due to many years of being prescribed together (via separate pills). They proposed combining six medications already established in treating cardiovascular disease and associated conditions, providing these in a single pill to people in Western countries aged 55 years or more as a preventive measure (albeit in lower doses than when used for treatment).

=== Developments of preventive medicine applications ===
Any physician could currently prescribe all the components of many proposed polypills separately for their patients, whether therapeutically or preventively. And since the ingredients of many possible polypills are off patent, it can be cheap to commercialize, although FDC products with novel combinations or formulations can sometimes themselves be patented. Of course, for any FDC product, the potential market for a given combination of drugs/dosages would need to be sufficiently large to justify the clinical trials and other expenses associated with mass-producing a new drug.

=== Producing countries ===
The polypill, drugs to lower blood pressure, is produced in Iran by the support of Execution of Imam Khomeini's Order was designed 14 years ago and called "PolyIran". According to the study was conducted by doctors from Tehran University, the University of Birmingham in Britain and other institutions and published by The Lancet, it worked quite well in a new study, slashing the rate of heart attacks by more than half among those who regularly took the pills. The pill in the study, which involved the participation of 6,800 rural villagers aged 50 to 75 in Iran, contained a cholesterol-lowering statin, two blood-pressure drugs and a low-dose aspirin.

Certain "cardiovascular polypills" are currently available in India and have been extensively studied there (see Polycap and PolyIran, for examples). Also, cardiologists in Spain are developing a polypill for secondary cardiovascular prevention.

=== Preventive use rationale: Treatment of population risk ===
Some preventive-use advocates propose that everyone over a given age (e.g., 55) should take such medications for preventive health, irrespective of individual risk factor levels. The idea is that most people in western countries are at high overall risk, thus lowering risk factor levels will provide broad benefit. This approach emphasizes the perspective that risk factors are continuous, and rigid dichotomies such as "hypertension" and "no hypertension" may be over-simplified and can be viewed instead as continuums of inter-connected factors.

In this paradigm, doctors would in effect be treating population risk rather than individual risk factor thresholds as is current mainstream practice. So, if everyone were given a relevant kind of polypill, the average blood pressure and cholesterol levels in the population would fall, thus reducing overall population risk. Perhaps ironically, this is in a sense going in the opposite direction from personalized medicine, since mass-produced or fixed-dose-combination polypills are in some tension with the goals of personalized medicine, due to the "fixed" nature of the "dose combinations." Proponents of this population-focused approach contend that the advantages of drug consolidation can outweigh any reduction in personalization of drug and/or dose selection. Also, depending on the demographic distribution and market size, there may be room for some different alternative versions of certain general FDCs to be manufactured with differences in their respective dosages and/or drugs. A widely distributed polypill could contain three blood pressure medications at low dose: a diuretic, such as hydrochlorothiazide, a beta-blocker such as atenolol, and an ACE inhibitor such as lisinopril; and these could be combined with a statin such as simvastatin, aspirin at a dose of 75 mg, and folic acid, which has been shown to reduce the level of homocysteine in the blood, which is another risk factor for heart disease.

== Selected publications ==
- Fuster V, Sanz G (April 2007). "A polypill for secondary prevention: time to move from intellectual debate to action". Nat Clin Pract Cardiovasc Med. 4 (4): 173. doi:10.1038/ncpcardio0858. PMID 17380163.
- Wald NJ, Law MR (June 2003). "A strategy to reduce cardiovascular disease by more than 80%". BMJ. 326 (7404): 1419. doi:10.1136/bmj.326.7404.1419. PMC 162259. PMID 12829553.
- "Tests start on pill that could lengthen millions of lives: Tablet aims to cut heart attack and stroke risk: Four-in-one drug could be sold for just $1 a month" Sarah Boseley, health editor The Guardian, Monday September 29 2008.
- Xavier D, Pais P, Sigamani A, Pogue J, Afzal R, Yusuf S (February 2009). "The need to test the theories behind the Polypill: rationale behind the Indian Polycap Study". Nat Clin Pract Cardiovasc Med. 6 (2): 96–7. doi:10.1038/ncpcardio1438. PMID 19104516.
- Cannon CP (April 2009). "Can the polypill save the world from heart disease?". Lancet. 373 (9672): 1313–4. doi:10.1016/S0140-6736(09)60652-8. PMID 19339044.
- Gorman, Rachael Moeller. "The Polypill" Proto, Winter 2007
