= Effervescence =

Fizzing or foaming caused by the escape of gas from a solution

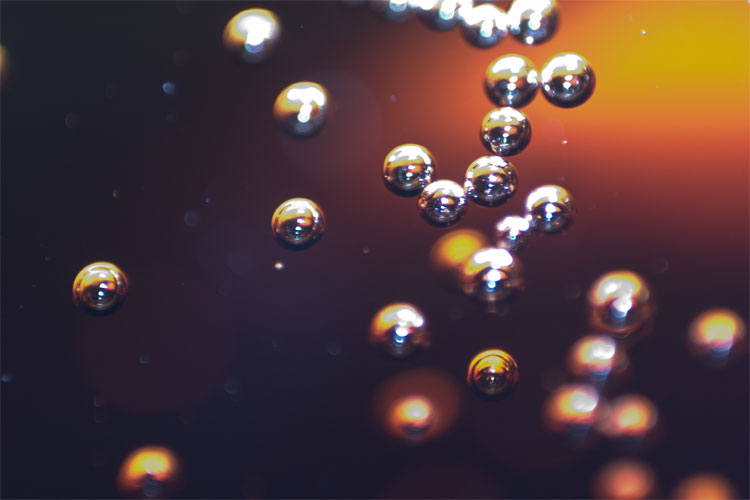
Bubbles of carbon dioxide float to the surface of a carbonated soft drink.

Effervescence is the escape of gas from an aqueous solution and the foaming or fizzing that results from that release. The word effervescence is derived from the Latin verb fervere (to boil), preceded by the prefix ex. It has the same linguistic root as the word fermentation.

Effervescence can also be observed when opening a bottle of champagne, beer or carbonated soft drink. The visible bubbles are produced by the escape from solution of the dissolved gas (which itself is not visible while dissolved in the liquid).

== In beverages ==
Although CO_{2} is most common for beverages, nitrogen gas is sometimes deliberately added to certain beers. The smaller bubble size creates a smoother beer head. Due to the poor solubility of nitrogen in beer, kegs or widgets are used for this.

== Chemistry ==
In the laboratory, a common example of effervescence is seen if hydrochloric acid is added to a block of limestone. If a few pieces of marble or an antacid tablet are put in hydrochloric acid in a test tube fitted with a bung, effervescence of carbon dioxide can be witnessed.

CaCO_{3} + 2 HCl → CaCl_{2} + H_{2}O + CO_{2}↑

This process is generally represented by the following reaction, where a pressurized dilute solution of carbonic acid in water releases gaseous carbon dioxide at decompression:

H_{2}CO_{3} → H_{2}O + CO_{2}↑

In simple terms, it is the result of the chemical reaction occurring in the liquid which produces a gaseous product.

== See also ==
- Cavitation
- Carbonation
- Effervescent tablet
- Precipitation (chemistry), the "down-arrow"
