= Salicyluric acid =

Chemical compound

Identifiers
- CAS Number: 487-54-7
- ChemSpider: 9835
- UNII: 5BR3P7J05U
- ChEMBL: ChEMBL586
- CompTox Dashboard (EPA): DTXSID70197592
- ECHA InfoCard: 100.006.965

Chemical and physical data
- Formula: C_{9}H_{9}NO_{4}
- Molar mass: 195.174 g·mol^{−1}
- 3D model (JSmol): Interactive image
- Melting point: 164–165 °C (327–329 °F)
- SMILES: c1ccc(c(c1)C(=O)NCC(=O)O)O
- InChI: InChI=1S/C9H9NO4/c11-7-4-2-1-3-6(7)9(14)10-5-8(12)13/h1-4,11H,5H2,(H,10,14)(H,12,13); Key:ONJSZLXSECQROL-UHFFFAOYSA-N

Salicyluric acid is the glycine conjugate of salicylic acid and is the primary form in which salicylates are excreted from the body, via the kidneys. The pathway is very similar to the pathway of benzoic acid excretion as hippuric acid.
