= AFP-L3 =

In oncology, AFP-L3 is an isoform of alpha-fetoprotein (AFP), a substance typically used in the triple test during pregnancy and for screening chronic liver disease patients for hepatocellular carcinoma (HCC). AFP can be fractionated by affinity electrophoresis into three glycoforms: L1, L2, and L3 based on the reactivity with the lectin Lens culinaris (lentil) agglutinin (LCA). AFP-L3 binds strongly to LCA via an additional α 1-6 fucose residue attached at the reducing terminus of N-Acetylglucosamine; this is in contrast to the L1 isoform. It is the L1 isoform which is typically associated with non-HCC inflammation of liver disease condition. The L3 isoform is specific to malignant tumors and its detected presence can serve to identify patients whom need increased monitoring for the development of HCC in high risk populations (i.e. chronic hepatitis B and C and/or liver cirrhosis). AFP-L3% is now being considered as a tumor marker for the North American demographic.

== AFP-L3% assay ==
AFP-L3 is isolated via an immunoassay and quantified using chemiluminescence on an automated platform. Results for AFP-L3 are represented as a ratio of LCA-reactive AFP to total AFP (AFP-L3%). The AFP-L3% assay, a liquid-phase binding assay, will help to identify at-risk subjects earlier, allowing for more intense evaluation for evidence of HCC according to existing practice guidelines in oncology. AFP-L3% is the standard for quantifying the L3 isoform of AFP in serum of high risk chronic liver disease (CLD) patients. Studies have shown that AFP-L3% test results of more than 10% can be indicative of early HCC or early nonseminomatous germ cell tumor.

Early testimonials from hepatologists indicate that there is a target patient population for the AFP-L3% assay. This target population are those CLD patients who have AFP concentrations in the indeterminate range of 20-200+ ng/mL and a small or indeterminate mass on imaging. It is in this range that doctors experience trouble differentiating non-HCC fluctuations in AFP vs indication of HCC. In such patients these hepatologists recommend utilizing AFP-L3% to clarify the disease state. Some hepatologists also use a positive result to urge insurance companies to pay for more frequent and intensive imaging.

Ultimately AFP-L3% may be used as a rule-in or rule-out assay for transplantation consideration and/or an intermediate step in surveillance precluding costly imaging on patients with fluctuating AFP results but negative for HCC.
