= Effervescent tablet =

Tablets to release carbon dioxide in water

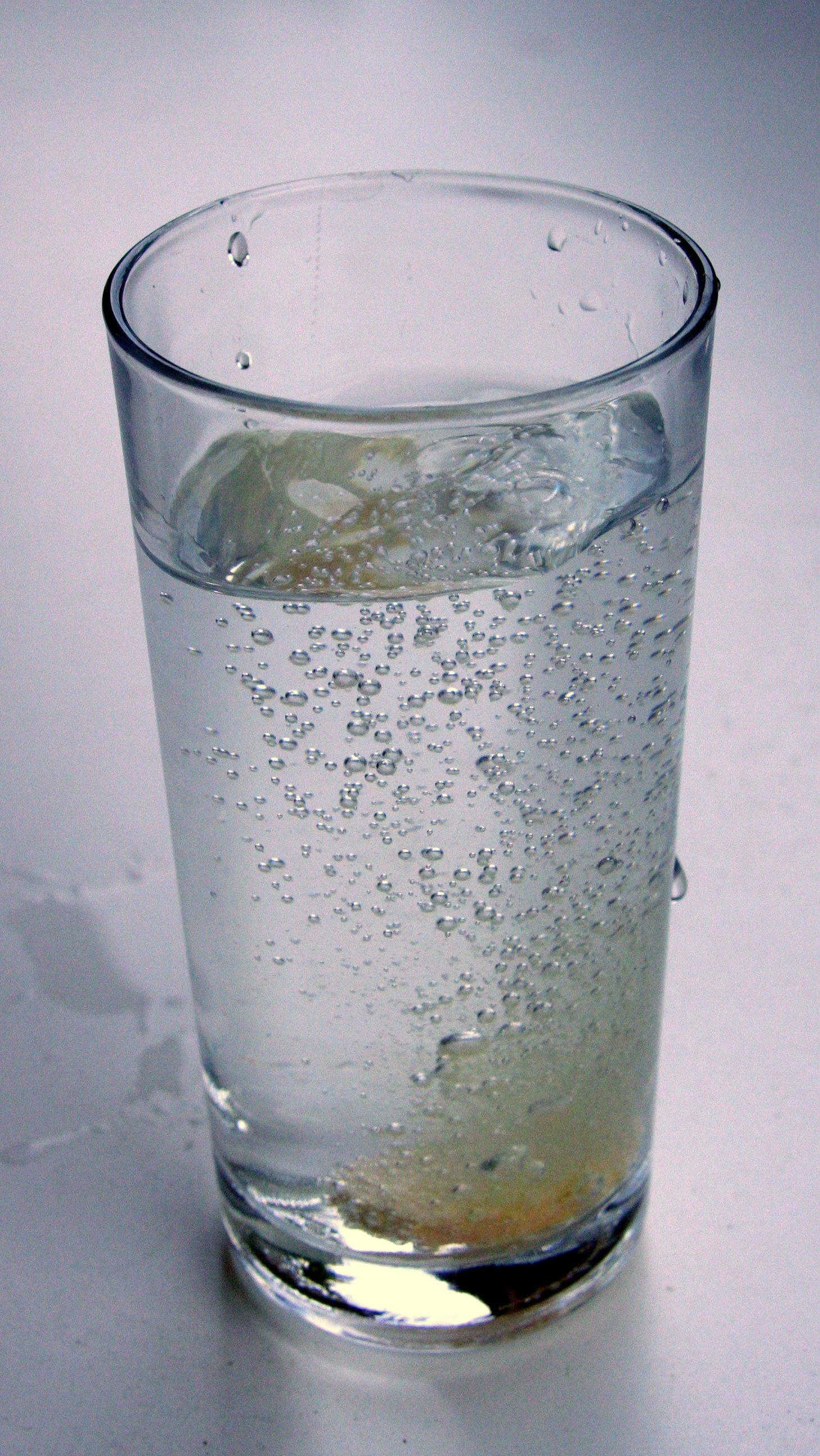
An effervescent tablet in a glass of water

An effervescent tablet with cleaning agent for dentures dissolves in a glass of water

Effervescent or carbon tablets are tablets which are designed to dissolve in water and release carbon dioxide. The carbon dioxide is generated by a reaction of a compound containing bicarbonate, such as sodium bicarbonate or magnesium bicarbonate, with an acid such as citric acid or tartaric acid. Both compounds are present in the tablet in powder form and start reacting as soon as they dissolve in water.

Effervescent tablets are made by compression of ingredients in the form of powders into a dense mass, which is packaged in blister pack, or with a hermetically sealed package with incorporated desiccant in the cap. To use them, they are dropped into water to make a solution. The powdered ingredients are also packaged and sold as effervescent powders or may be granulated and sold as effervescent granules. Generally powdered ingredients are first granularized before being made into tablets.

Effervescent medicinal beverages date back to the late 1800s and originally arose to mask the taste of bitter waters taken as curatives, during the water cure craze of that era.

== History ==
In the 17th and 18th centuries, scientists began uncovering the chemical make-up and physiological benefits of various salts such as Glauber's salt and Epsom salts. These salts were found in mineral springs, which, since the Roman Empire, had been used as health spas, where people would go to bathe in, and drink, mineral-rich waters for their health. These developments led to attempts to replicate the salt mixtures found in these naturally occurring mineral waters using off-the-shelf ingredients. Mixing these kinds of salts—especially carbonates and tartrates—with flavorings like lemon into an effervescent compound with citric or tartaric acid proved especially popular and set off a craze for the new "fruit salts". Effervescent tablets have been used as products of the pharmaceutical and dietary industries for over two centuries.

== Use ==
=== In by-mouth medicine ===
Vitamins may be sold as effervescent tablets.

There are several categories of active ingredients that may be best administered in the form of effervescent preparations:

1. Those that are difficult to digest or disruptive to the stomach or esophagus
2. Those that are pH–sensitive, such as amino acids and antibiotics.
3. Those requiring a large dose.
4. Those that are susceptible to light, oxygen, or moisture.
5. It is used as a gastrointestinal agent.

Effervescent preparations may enhance absorption and speed up onset of action by increasing gastric pH, therefore hastening the emptying of medication into the small intestine. The carbon dioxide bubbles may also help intestinal absorption by opening up paracellular transport. Extreme bioavailability differences of up to 4-fold have been reported comparing effervescent tablets with ordinary tablets, highlighting the need for extra bioequivalence studies when switching dosage forms.

=== Other ===
"Cleaning tablets" are formulations carrying detergents for cleaning. They may be used in laundry, in cleaning of specific machines or containers, in cleaning of dentures and contact lenses, etc.

Some tablets used for dyeing eggs for Easter are effervescent.

There also exist effervescent tablets for making carbonated drinks or soda water.

== Capsules ==
Effervescent tablets mostly come in capsules constructed for these tablets. They may contain an anti-bacterial coating and are water-resistant. The cap contains a little spring-like spiral, which helps keep the tablets in place during transportation and prevents them from breaking. The cap also contains little balls made out of silica gel. They sit after a little piece of cardboard and make sure no moisture comes into contact with the tablets.

== Contraindications ==
It is dangerous to swallow an effervescent tablet directly, as the tablet can get stuck in the subglottis and fizzle there. A potentially fatal edema may occur from the irritation. In addition, conventional effervescent tablets contain a significant amount of sodium and are associated with increased odds of adverse cardiovascular events according to a 2013 study. Low or no-sodium formulations exist.

== Adverse effects ==
=== Demineralization potential ===
The acidic nature of effervescent tablets can lower the pH of the oral environment, promoting acid-induced demineralization.

== See also ==
- Sherbet (powder), effervescent powder for drinks
