= Alpha-fetoprotein =

Fetal analogue of serum albumin

AFP
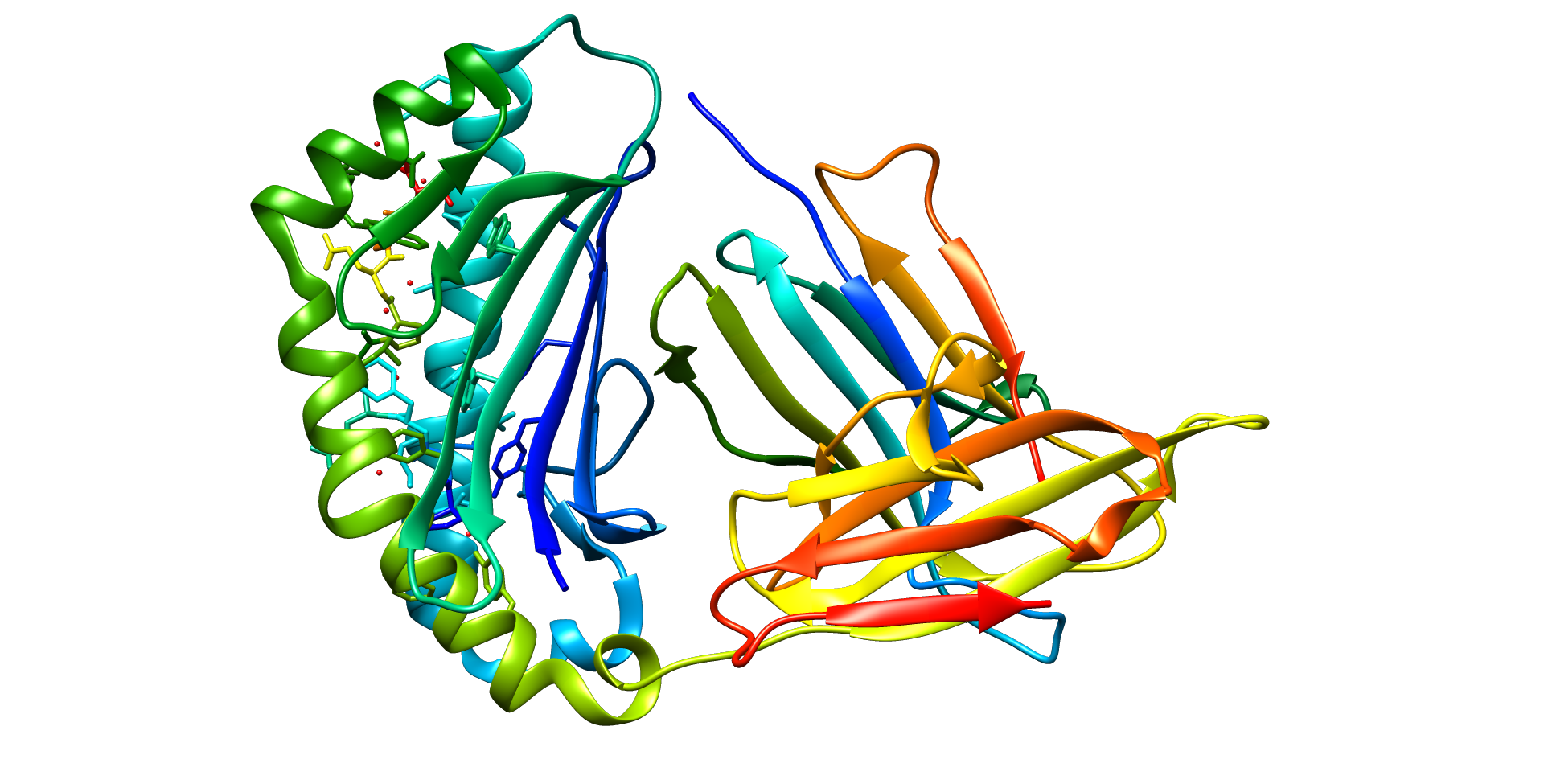

Identifiers
- Aliases: AFP, AFPD, FETA, HPalpha fetoprotein
- External IDs: OMIM: 104150; MGI: 87951; GeneCards: AFP
Available structures
| PDB | Ortholog search: PDBe RCSB |
| PDB | List of PDB id codes 3MRK |

Gene location (Human)
| Chr. | Chromosome 4 (human) |
| Band | 4q13.3 | Start | 73,431,138 bp |
| Band | 4q13.3 | End | 73,456,174 bp |

Gene location (Mouse)
| Chr. | Chromosome 5 (mouse) |
| Band | 5 E1|5 44.77 cM | Start | 90,638,596 bp |
| Band | 5 E1|5 44.77 cM | End | 90,656,766 bp |
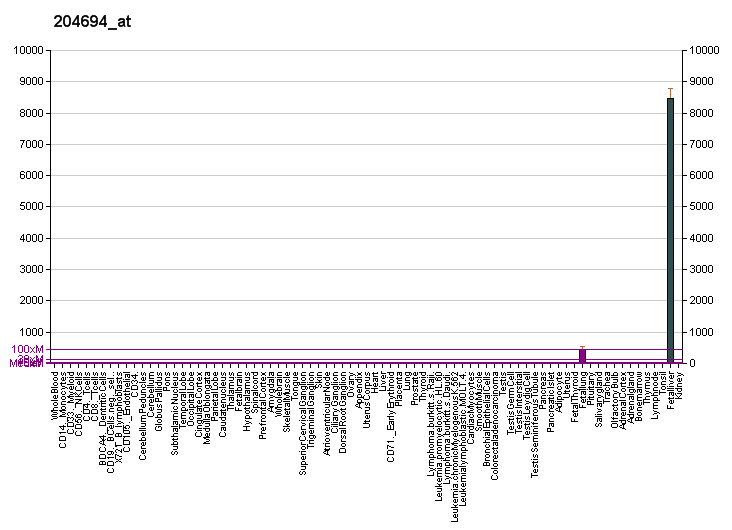
RNA expression pattern
| Bgee | Human / Mouse (ortholog); Top expressed in: testicle; gonad; right lobe of liver; human kidney; embryo; amniotic fluid; metanephros; right adrenal cortex; ascending aorta; lactiferous gland / Top expressed in: human fetus; abdominal wall; fetal liver hematopoietic progenitor cell; yolk sac; epithelium of small intestine; atrioventricular valve; internal carotid artery; external carotid artery; migratory enteric neural crest cell; primitive streak; More reference expression data |
| BioGPS | More reference expression data |
Gene ontology
| Molecular function | metal ion binding; protein binding |
| Cellular component | extracellular region; extracellular space; cytoplasm; endoplasmic reticulum lumen |
| Biological process | ovulation from ovarian follicle; SMAD protein signal transduction; sexual reproduction; progesterone metabolic process; post-translational protein modification |
Sources:Amigo / QuickGO
Orthologs
| Databases | NCBI: entry; OMA: entry |
| Species | Human | Mouse |
| Entrez | 174 | 11576 |
| Ensembl | ENSG00000081051 | ENSMUSG00000054932 |
| UniProt | P02771 | P02772 |
| RefSeq (mRNA) | NM_001134; NM_001354717 | NM_007423 |
| RefSeq (protein) | NP_001125; NP_001341646 | NP_031449 |
| Location (UCSC) | Chr 4: 73.43 – 73.46 Mb | Chr 5: 90.64 – 90.66 Mb |
| PubMed search |
- Wikidata
| View/Edit Human | View/Edit Mouse |

Alpha-fetoprotein (AFP, α-fetoprotein; also sometimes called alpha-1-fetoprotein, alpha-fetoglobulin, or alpha fetal protein) is a protein that in humans is encoded by the AFP gene. The AFP gene is located on the q arm of chromosome 4 (4q13.3). Maternal AFP serum level is used to screen for Down syndrome, neural tube defects, and other chromosomal abnormalities.

AFP is a major plasma protein produced by the yolk sac and the fetal liver during fetal development. It is thought to be the fetal analog of serum albumin. AFP binds to copper, nickel, fatty acids and bilirubin and is found in monomeric, dimeric and trimeric forms.

== Structure ==
AFP is a glycoprotein of 591 amino acids and a carbohydrate moiety.

== Function ==
The function of AFP in adult humans is unknown. AFP is the most abundant plasma protein found in the human fetus. In the fetus, AFP is produced by both the liver and the yolk sac. It is believed to function as a carrier protein (similar to albumin) that transports materials such as fatty acids to cells. Maternal plasma levels rise until the 32nd week of pregnancy, when they begin to decline. They decrease rapidly after birth. Normal adult levels in the newborn are usually reached by the age of 8 to 12 months. While the function in humans is unknown, in rodents it binds estradiol to prevent the transport of this hormone across the placenta to the fetus. The main function of this is to prevent the virilization of female fetuses. As human AFP does not bind estrogen, its function in humans is less clear. In human liver cancer, AFP is found to bind glypican-3 (GPC3), another oncofetal antigen.

The rodent AFP system can be overridden with massive injections of estrogen, which overwhelm the AFP system and will masculinize the fetus. The masculinizing effect of estrogens may seem counter-intuitive since estrogens are critical for the proper development of female secondary characteristics during puberty. However, this is not the case prenatally. Gonadal hormones from the testes, such as testosterone and anti-Müllerian hormone, are required to cause development of a phenotypic male. Without these hormones, the fetus will develop into a phenotypic female even if genetically XY. The conversion of testosterone into estradiol by aromatase in many tissues may be an important step in masculinization of that tissue. Masculinization of the brain is thought to occur both by conversion of testosterone into estradiol by aromatase, but also by de novo synthesis of estrogens within the brain. Thus, AFP may protect the fetus from maternal estradiol that would otherwise have a masculinizing effect on the fetus, but its exact role is still controversial.

== Serum levels ==
=== Maternal ===
Fetal AFP levels can be monitored in the urine of pregnant women. Since AFP is quickly cleared from the mother's serum via her kidneys, maternal urine AFP correlates with fetal serum levels, although the maternal urine level is much lower than the fetal serum level. AFP levels rise until about week 32. Maternal serum alpha-fetoprotein (MSAFP) screening is performed at 16 to 18 weeks of gestation. If MSAFP levels indicate an anomaly, amniocentesis may be offered to the patient.

=== Infants ===
The normal range of AFP for adults and children is variously reported as under 50, under 10, or under 5 ng/mL. At birth, normal infants have AFP levels four or more orders of magnitude above this normal range, that decreases to a normal range over the first year of life.

During this time, the normal range of AFP levels spans approximately two orders of magnitude. Correct evaluation of abnormal AFP levels in infants must take into account these normal patterns.

Very high AFP levels may be subject to hooking (see tumor marker), which results in the level being reported significantly lower than the actual concentration. This is important for analysis of a series of AFP tumor marker tests, e.g. in the context of post-treatment early surveillance of cancer survivors, where the rate of decrease of AFP has diagnostic value.

== Clinical significance ==
Measurement of AFP is generally used in two clinical contexts. First, it is measured in pregnant women through the analysis of maternal blood or amniotic fluid as a screening test for certain developmental abnormalities, such as aneuploidy. Second, serum AFP level is elevated in people with certain tumors, and so it is used as a biomarker to follow these diseases. Some of these diseases are listed below:

- Developmental birth defects associated with elevated AFP
  - Omphalocele
  - Gastroschisis
  - Neural tube defects: elevated α-fetoprotein in amniotic fluid and maternal serum
- Tumors associated with elevated AFP
  - Hepatocellular carcinoma
  - Metastatic disease affecting the liver
  - Nonseminomatous germ cell tumors
  - Yolk sac tumor
- Other conditions associated with elevated AFP
  - Ataxia telangiectasia: elevated AFP is used as one factor in diagnosis

A peptide derived from AFP that is referred to as AFPep is claimed to possess anti-cancer properties.

In the treatment of testicular cancer it is paramount to differentiate seminomatous and nonseminomatous tumors. This is typically done pathologically after removal of the testicle and confirmed by tumor markers. However, if the pathology is pure seminoma but the AFP is elevated, the tumor is treated as a nonseminomatous tumor because it contains yolk sac (nonseminomatous) components.

== See also ==
- Tumor marker
- AFP-L3
- Triple test
- Advanced maternal age
