= Extracranial germ cell tumor =

Type of tumor

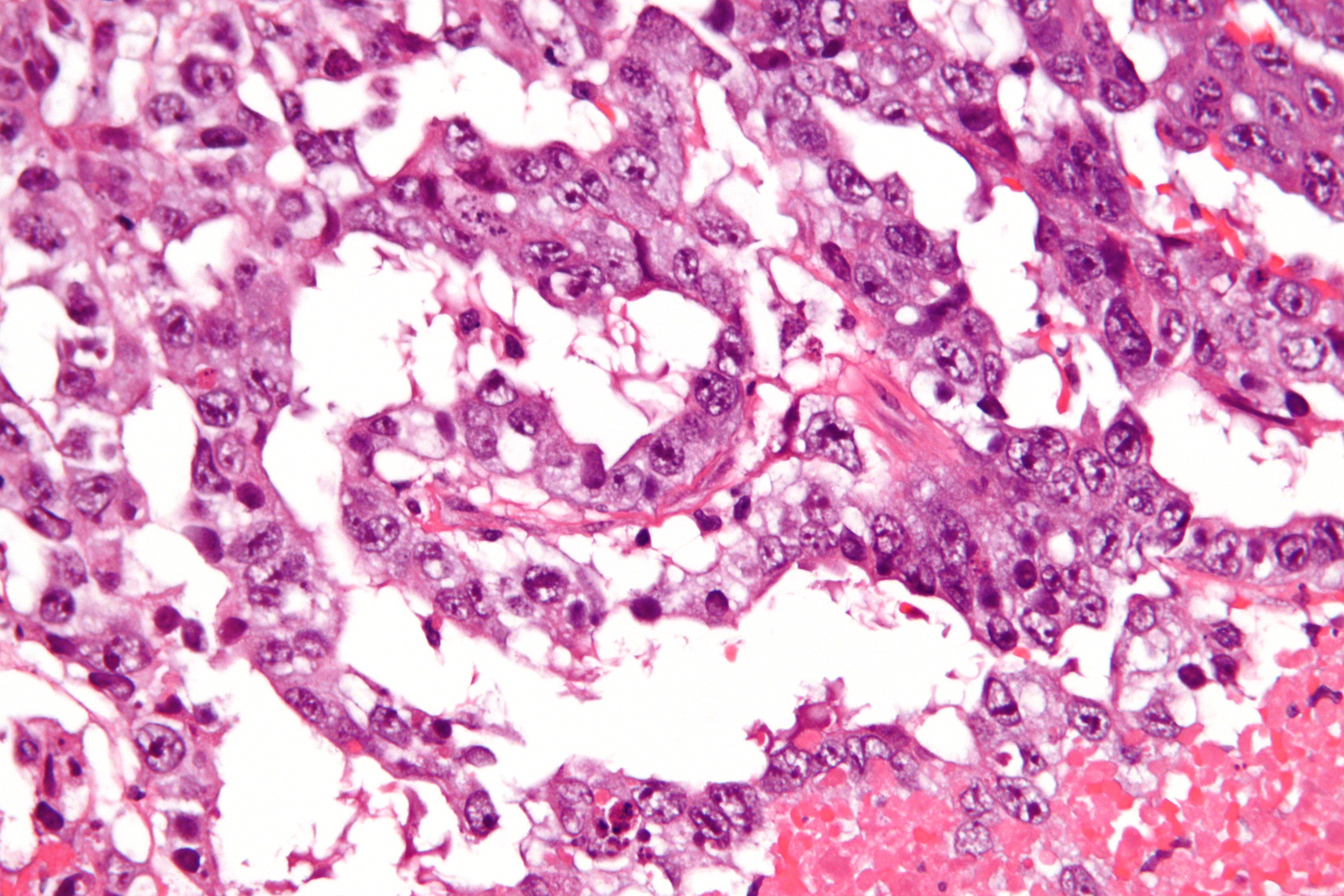
- A mixed germ cell tumor
- Specialty: Oncology
- Symptoms: Painless bump in the center of body, abnormal menstruation, bump in testes
- Risk factors: Specific genetic syndrome, congenital abnormalities
- Diagnostic method: Tumor marker test, immunohistochemistry, MRI, chest x-ray, CT scan, ultrasound exam, biopsy
- Treatment: Surgery, chemotherapy, radiotherapy
- Medication: Cisplatin based chemotherapy, BEP (cisplatin, etoposide, and bleomycin)
- Prognosis: High survival rate after treatments
- Frequency: 3%(<15) and 14%(≥15)

An extracranial germ cell tumor (EGCT) occurs in the abnormal growth of germ cells in the gonads (testes or ovaries) and the areas other than the brain via tissue, lymphatic system, or circulatory system. The tumor can be benign or malignant (cancerous) by its growth rate. According to the National Cancer Institute and St. Jude Children's Research Hospital, the chance of children who are under 15 years old having EGCTs is 3%, in comparison to adolescents, a possibility of 14% with aged 15 to 19 can have EGCTs. There is no obvious cut point in between children and adolescents. However, common cut points in researches are 11 years old and 15 years old.

The signs and symptoms are varied according to the location of the EGCTs. Common symptoms are fever, constipation, abdomen mass with or without pain, backache, bumps in testicles for male, abnormal bleeding in vagina or miss menses for female. The cause of EGCTs has not been found. Some potential risk factors include smoking, alcohol consumption, specific genetic syndromes, congenital abnormalities, and more. Among these risk factors, specifically, the Klinefelter syndrome (KS) and cryptorchidism increase the possibility for males having testicular tumors and the Turner syndrome (TS) affects the risk of having ovarian cysts in females. Swyer syndrome and other syndromes may increase the risk of having EGCTs in the gonads.

The diagnosis is made by a combination of picture-taking testaments, physical examinations, and the investigation of samples from blood, urine, and tissue by using microscope. By collecting the data from the testaments, clinicians use the classifications of EGCTs to assist diagnosing the type of tumor. Due to the probability of having EGCTs among pediatric, several treatments had been used to remove the tumor or kill the cancer cells. The treatments include surgery, chemotherapy, radiation therapy, targeted therapy, salvage therapy, and clinical trials. Among the treatments, the BEP combination (bleomycin, etoposide, cisplatin) is the standard chemotherapy treatment method for EGCTs by increasing the survival rate. The prognosis of EGCTs are varied after a series of treatments and follow-up testaments which include factors of age, gender, type of EGCT, location the cyst, treatment method, response, and symptoms are presented after a period of time.

== Signs and symptoms ==
Signs and symptoms of extracranial germ cell tumor can be seen in children, adolescents, or young adults. These symptoms include fever, constipation, abnormal bleeding in vagina and miss menstruation in females, a lump in the testes in males, lumps along the midline of the body, include coccyx, neck, and abdomen. The symptoms of EGCTs appear differently by the location of it. According to the symptoms and location of the EGCTs, specialists may diagnose the type of the tumor.

== Risk factors ==
There is no evidence that indicate the cause of having extracranial germ cell tumor. Despite the unknown causing factor of EGCTs, researchers suggested the tumor cells begin from the germ cells which locate in the testes in male and ovaries in female. After the formation of germ cells, it migrates from the gonad to the rest of the body which form the extracranial extragonadal germ-cell tumors.

The risk factors may increase the probability of developing EGCTs. The risk factors that have been recognized are genetic syndromes and congenital abnormalities.

- Klinefelter syndrome - mediastinal GCTs
- Swyer syndrome - gonadoblastomas and seminomas (testicle)
- Turner syndrome - gonadoblastomas and dysgerminomas (ovary)

These syndromes had been discovered of having higher risk in developing EGCTs. Besides the effects of syndromes, cryptorchidism, the absence of one or both testes, may increase the risk for male diagnose testicular seminoma tumor. Environmental risk factors may increase the risk of diagnosing EGCTs, which includes smoking, alcohol consumption, chemical environment. It does not mean that not having these risk factors will have no chance in diagnosing EGCTs. On the other hand, having risk factors does not mean the person is diagnosed with EGCTs. In order to check the existence of the tumor, a series of testaments is required.

== Diagnosis ==
Professionals use a combination of testaments to diagnose the type or stage of EGCT is present. Common testaments for EGCTs are a physical examination, tumor marker test, immunohistochemistry, cytogenetic analysis, MRI, chest x-ray, CT scan (CAT scan), ultrasound exam, and biopsy. Explanations for each testament are below.

- Physical examination: a body check to look for signs of disease, such as a lump in the testicle in males or abnormal virginal bleeding in females.
- Tumor marker test: two tumor markers are tested, alpha-fetoprotein (AFP) and beta-human chorionic gonadotropin (β-hCG), to detect and diagnose the EGCTs.
- Immunohistochemistry: the use of antibodies to detect the reaction of antigens in the human body.
- Cytogenetic analysis: a method to discover abnormal arrangement of chromosomes in the tumor cells.
- MRI: an instrument that uses magnetic field, radio waves, and a computer to investigate the condition inside the human body through a series of pictures.
- Chest x-ray: an x-ray test that showed the area of chest with blood vessels, heart, lungs, and bones.
- CT scan (CAT scan): an instrument can get more detailed pictures of the human body by using special x-ray.
- Ultrasound exam: images are shown by the methodology of high-energy sound waves bouncing off the human tissues and organs.
- Biopsy: using a microscope to examine abnormal cells from the removed tissue from the human body.

Through the images from multiple picture-taking testaments, abnormal circle-shaped tissues are shown. According to the size of the tumor, patient's age and gender, specialists diagnose the stage of the EGCT. The method of biopsy presents the tumor cells characteristics through a microscope. Inside the tumor tissue, clustered of tumor cells is shown. Furthermore, by examining the tumor cells individually, it has various shapes and sizes where healthy cells are in round shapes.

The tumor marker test includes two markers, AFP and β-hCG, to detect and classify which type of cancer cell is present. An increasing level in both markers indicates the sign of diagnosing germ cell tumor. AFP (IU/mL) or ng/mL is a protein which a very high concentration of AFP may lead to germ cell tumor. The AFP tumor marker had been used for the ovarian GCT or testicular GCT. The beta-human chorionic gonadotropin (β-hCG) is a hormone produced from the abnormal tumor tissue. The β-hCG test takes sample either from blood or urine. Also, this tumor marker test is commonly used for germ cell tumors. Both the tumor marker test and immunohistochemistry measure AFP and β-hCG; however, the method of testing the markers is different, whereas immunohistochemistry discover the cancer by looking at the antibody-antigen interactions under a microscope.

=== Classifications ===
There are two types of classification for the extracranial germ cell tumor. One is GCT biology and another is to classify EGCT into 3 types. Both classifications are used by professionals to diagnose the type of tumor the patient has by the assistance of multiple results from different testaments.

The first classification organized the EGCTs into two types, gonadal and extragonadal germ-cell tumor. Gonadal GCTs include Testicular GCTs in males and Ovarian GCTs in females. Extracranial extragonadal GCTs are tumor cells that had been spread out through tissue, lymph system or blood to other areas of the body other than the gonads.

==== Testicular GCT ====
A painless bump in the testes represents the testicular GCT in male. The Klinefelter syndrome Swyer syndrome may increase the risk of having testicular GCT. Two common age ranges for testicular GCT is before 4 years old or after puberty. A stage I testicular GCT is considered a low risk tumor where all ages of male may diagnose. Patients that are 11 years old or above, stage II to IV testicular GCT are classified as standard risk 1 (intermediate 1). The classification for tumor as standard risk 2 (intermediate 2) and poor risk are commonly discovered among patients who are under 11 years old. The common treatments for testicular GCTs are chemotherapy, surgery, and radiotherapy, where the medication of PEB (cisplatin, etoposide, and bleomycin) had been used commonly.

==== Ovarian GCT ====
It is also called Dysgerminoma. The common symptom of the ovarian GCTs is a pelvic mass with pain among female. However, it is not common among children where an approximate chance of 2.6 out of 100,000 female will diagnose the ovarian GCT. Common treatments are chemotherapy, surgery, and radiotherapy. According to the site of the tumor, stage of the tumor, and type of tumor to proceed appropriate treatments, where surgical resection is the most common treatment.

==== Extragonadal GCT ====
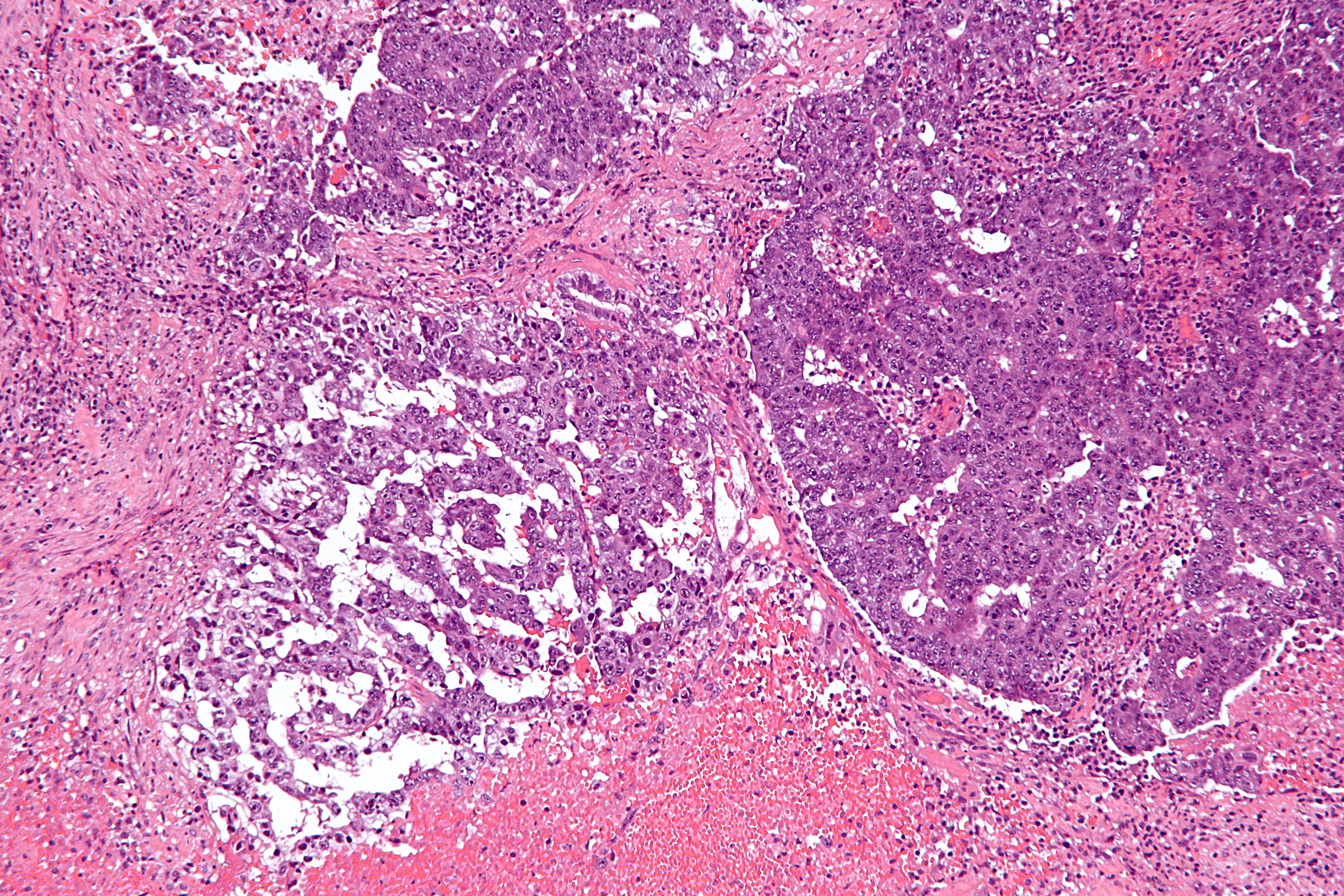
A mixed germ cell tumor in the testes. On the left side shows yolk sac tumor, and on the right side shows embryonal carcinoma.

Under the classification of the biology GCT, there is a more detailed classification contains specific types of extracranial extragonadal germ cell tumor. There are two types, teratomas, and malignant GCTs. Lists of these two categories and its subtypes are shown below.

- Teratomas
  - Mature teratomas
  - Immature teratomas
- Malignant GCTs
  - Seminomatous GCTs: seminoma, dysgerminoma, germinoma
  - Non-seminomatous GCTs: yolk sac tumor (endodermal sinus tumor), choriocarcinoma, embryonal carcinoma, gonadoblastoma, teratoma & yolk sac tumor
  - Mixed GCTs: a combination of EGCTs. Common combinations include teratoma & embryonal carcinoma & yolk sac tumor (11%), seminoma & embryonal carcinoma (16%), and teratoma & embryonal carcinoma (26%).

The yolk sac tumor produce the AFP hormone, and the germinomas, choriocarcinomas, and seminoma are tumors that produce the β-hCG hormone. The hormones that are produced by the tumors can be detected while proceeding testaments.

=== Staging ===
By classifying the EGCTs, the professionals identify the type of tumor by its location and patient's symptoms. After completing multiple testaments, the professionals may classify the stage of the tumors from the results. The EGCTs can be divided into three risk groups, low risk, intermediate risk (standard risk 1 & 2), and poor risk. The survival rate is differed by the stage and risk groups of the tumor:

The Low Risk Group
	Stage	Survival %	Age
testis	I	100	any age group
ovary	I	96	any age group
extragonadal	I	93	any age group

The Intermediate Risk Group
	Stage	Survival %	Age
testis (S1)	II ~ IV	98	<11
ovary (S1)	II ~ IV	88	<11
extragonadal (S1)	II ~ IV	85	<11
testis (S2)	II ~ IV	88	≥11
ovary (S2)	II ~ IV	85	≥11
extragonadal (S2)	II	?	≥11

Abbreviation: S1 = Standard risk 1; S2 = Standard risk 2

The Poor Risk Group
	Stage	Survival %	Age
testis	II ~ IV	83	≥11
ovary	II ~ IV	60	≥11
extragonadal	II ~ IV	51	≥11

== Treatments ==
The combinations of treatments are applied to eliminate the tumor cells or remove it from the site. Various types of treatments depend on the location, type, and stage of the tumor. By applying proper treatments to increase the survival rate and reduce the possibility for tumor cells to recur:

- Surgery: the most common treatments by removing the EGCTs from the site of the tumor.
- Chemotherapy: the platinum-based chemotherapy drugs reduce the growth of tumor cell or destroy the tumor cells in order to prevent the cells become cancer cells. One of the most common drug is the BEP, which is a combination drug of cisplatin, etoposide, and bleomycin.
- Radiotherapy: by damaging tumor cells' DNA to stop the division of the cells.
- Targeted Therapy: similar to chemotherapy drugs, but the drugs specifically target the tumor cells by its genes, proteins, or the tissues where it influence the growth of tumor cells.
- Salvage Therapy: this treatment is given if there is no response to previous treatments.
- Clinical Trials: the follow-up study after the treatments such as surgery, chemotherapy, or radiotherapy.

Although there is a high possibility to eliminate the tumor cells by applying the treatments, there are consequences for side effects after treatments. The possible side effects for radiotherapy and chemotherapy include fatigue, skin changes, hair loss, diarrhea, difficulties in swallowing, vomiting, weight changes, swelling in breasts, sexual problems, fertility problems, and changes in the urinary and bladder.

== Prognosis ==
The prognosis, chance of recovery, can be varied by multiple factors, which include the location, type, and stage of tumor, the outcomes from the treatments, and other symptoms show recurred of tumors. Research discovered there was a lower survival percentage in the patients diagnosed in the mediastinum (66.7%±13.6%) than the other areas of the human body (96.0%±2.8%)(P=0.001). The cisplatin-based chemotherapy and surgical resections are the standard treatments for EGCTs, where the overall survival rate is approximately 80% and above among pediatric patients. The testaments and treatments had been mentioned above are used again if the tumor cells start to grow again.
