= Germinoma =

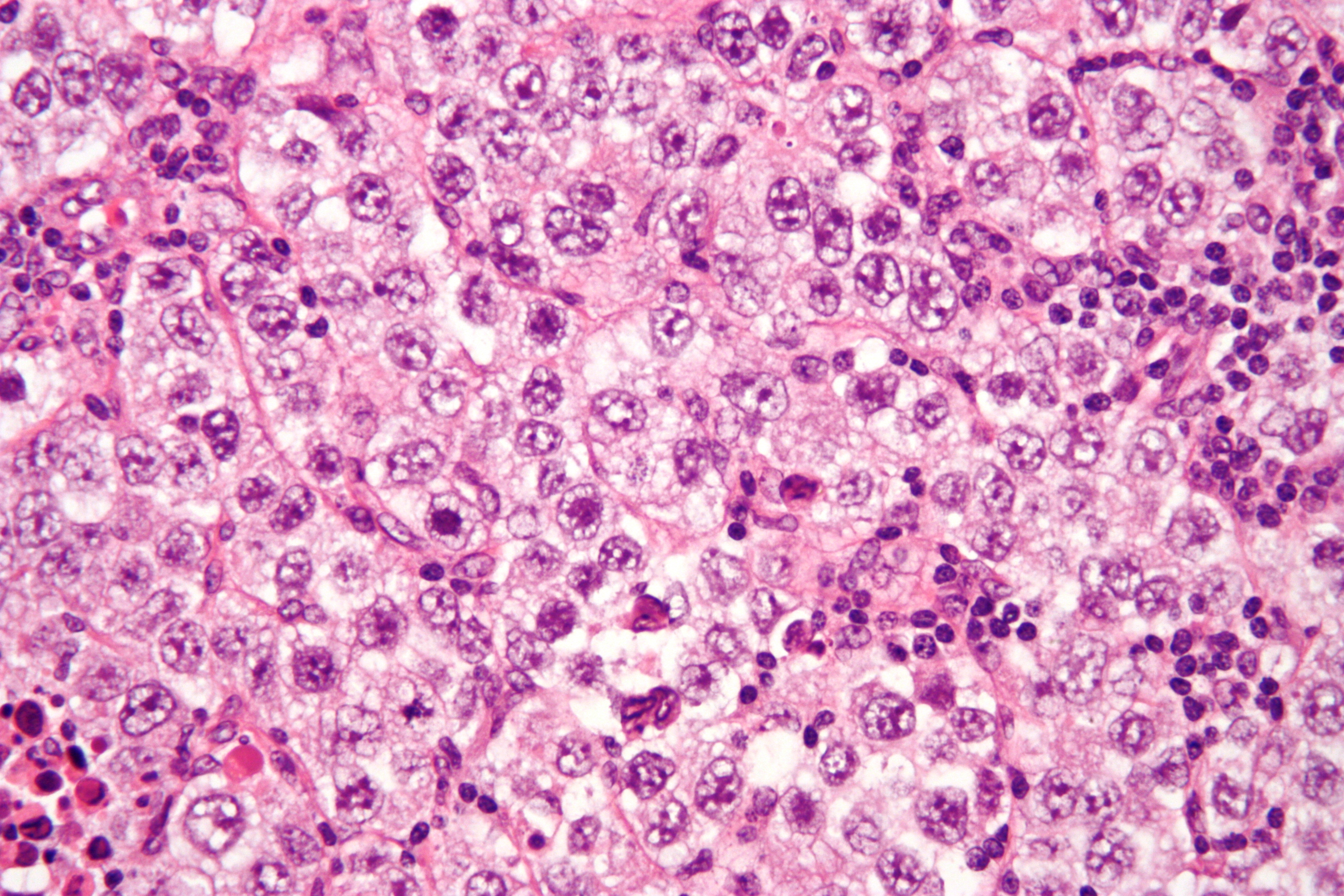
- Micrograph of a germinoma, H&E stain
- Specialty: Oncology

A germinoma is a type of germ-cell tumor, which is not differentiated upon examination. It may be benign or malignant.

== Cause ==
Germinomas are thought to originate from an error of development, when certain primordial germ cells fail to migrate properly. Germinomas lack histologic differentiation, whereas nongerminomatous germ-cell tumors display a variety of differentiation. Like other germ-cell tumors, germinomas can undergo malignant transformation.

== Histology ==
The tumor is uniform in appearance, consisting of large, round cells with vesicular nuclei and clear or finely granular cytoplasm that is eosinophilic. On gross examination, the external surface is smooth and bosselated (knobby), and the interior is soft, fleshy, and either cream-coloured, gray, pink, or tan. Microscopic examination typically reveals uniform cells that resemble primordial germ cells. Typically, the stroma contains lymphocytes, and about 20% of patients have sarcoid-like granulomas.

== Diagnosis ==
Metastasis has been noted in about 22% of cases at time of diagnosis. Males are roughly twice as commonly affected in developing germinomas. They are most commonly diagnosed between the ages of 10 and 21.

Often, serum and spinal fluid tumor markers of alpha-fetoprotein and beta-HCG are tested. Pure germinomas are not associated with these markers. Nongerminomatous germ-cell tumors may be associated with increased markers such as alpha-fetoprotein with yolk sac tumors, as well as embryonic cell carcinomas and immature teratomas and beta-HCG, which occur in choriocarcinomas. In one to 15% of germinomas, a low level of beta-HCG may be produced. Although controversial, HCG-secreting germinomas may be more aggressive than nonsecreting ones.

=== Classification ===
The term "germinoma" most often refers to a tumor in the brain that has a histology identical to two other tumors, dysgerminoma in the ovary and seminoma in the testis. Since 1994, MeSH has defined germinoma as "a malignant neoplasm of the germinal tissue of the gonads, mediastinum, or pineal region" and within its scope included both dysgerminoma and seminoma. Collectively, these are the seminomatous or germinomatous tumors.

=== Locations ===
==== Ovary (dysgerminoma) and testis (seminoma) ====
Dysgerminoma is the most common type of malignant germ-cell ovarian cancer. Dysgerminoma usually occurs in adolescence and early adult life; about 5% occur in prepubertal children. Dysgerminoma is extremely rare after age 50. It occurs in both ovaries in 10% of patients and, in a further 10%, a microscopic tumor is in the other ovary.

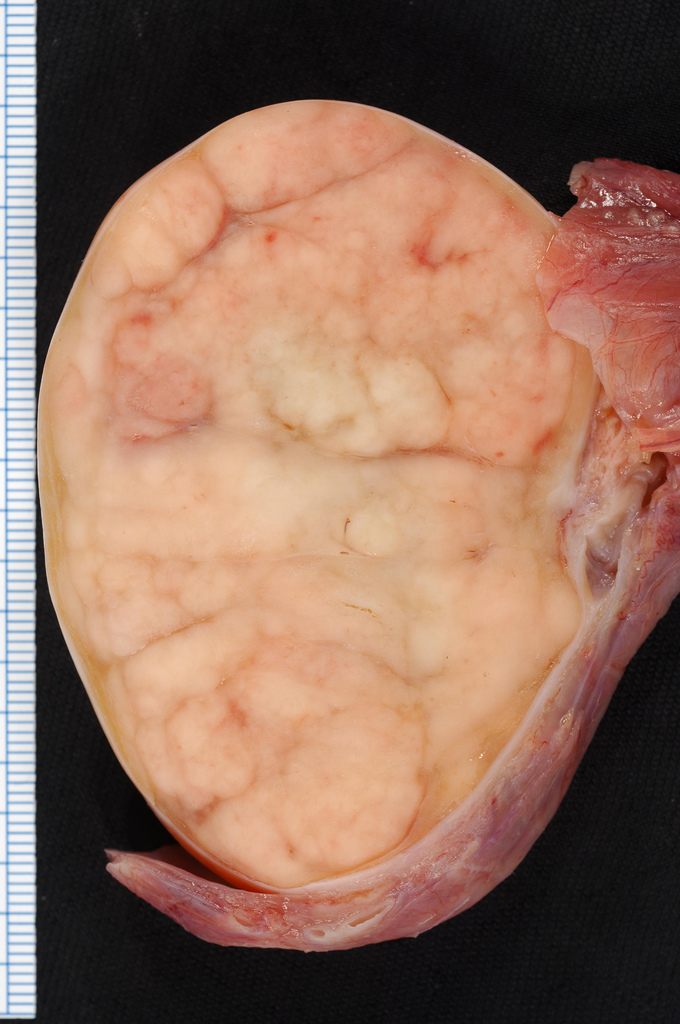
A 7.4 x 5.5-cm seminoma in a radical orchiectomy specimen from a 27-year-old man

Seminoma is the second-most common testicular cancer; the most common is mixed, which may contain seminoma.

Abnormal gonads (due to gonadal dysgenesis and androgen insensitivity syndrome) have a high risk of developing a dysgerminoma. Most dysgerminomas are associated with elevated serum lactic dehydrogenase, which is sometimes used as a tumor marker. Metastases are most often present in the lymph nodes.

==== Intracranial germinoma ====
Intracranial germinoma occurs in 0.7 per million children. As with other germ-cell tumors (GCTs) occurring outside the gonads, the most common location of intracranial germinoma is on or near the midline, often in the pineal or suprasellar areas; in 5-10% of patients with germinoma in either area, the tumor is in both areas. Like other GCTs, germinomas can occur in other parts of the brain. Within the brain, this tumor is most common in the hypothalamic or hypophyseal regions. In the thalamus and basal ganglia, germinoma is the most common GCT.

The diagnosis of an intracranial germinoma usually is based on biopsy, as the features on neuroimaging appear similar to other tumors.

Cytology of the cerebrospinal fluid often is studied to detect metastasis into the spine. This is important for staging and radiotherapy planning.

Intracranial germinomas have a reported 90% survival to five years after diagnosis. Near total resection does not seem to influence the cure rate, so gross total resection is not necessary and can increase the risk of complications from surgery. The best results have been reported from craniospinal radiation with local tumor boost of greater than 4,000 centigray (cGy).

== Treatment ==
Germinomas, like several other types of GCTs, are sensitive to both chemotherapy and radiotherapy. For this reason, treatment with these methods can offer excellent chances of long-term survival, even cure.

== Prognosis ==
Although chemotherapy can shrink germinomas, it is not generally recommended alone unless radiation has contraindications. In a study in the early 1990s, carboplatinum, etoposide, and bleomycin were given to 45 germinoma patients, and about half the patients relapsed. Most of these relapsed patients were then recovered with radiation or additional chemotherapy.

== See also ==
- Brown-Séquard syndrome (sections on cavernous malformation and germinoma)
- Spermatocytic tumor
