= Walter Schiller =

American pathologist

Walter Schiller

Dr. Walter Schiller (3 December 1887, Vienna – 2 May 1960, Evanston, Illinois) was an American pathologist. He published primarily in the field of gynaecological cancer, and described Schiller's test and Schiller-Duval bodies.

== Biography ==
Walter Schiller was born in Vienna in 1887, the only child of Friedrich and Emma Schiller, who were of Jewish descent. He studied in Vienna, working as a demonstrator of physiology under Sigmund Exner and pathology under Anton Weichselbaum. He received his doctorate from the University of Vienna in 1912, and worked as a bacteriologist in the Bulgarian Army during the First Balkan War in the same year. He trained in pathology under Weichselbaum, and was a Medizinaloffizier in charge of a medical laboratory in the Austro-Hungarian Army during World War I, serving in Bosnia, Russia, Turkey and Palestine.

From 1918 to 1921 he was pathologist to the Second Military Hospital of Vienna, where he worked with Hans Eppinger. From 1921 to 1936 he was Director of Laboratories at the second Gynaecological Clinic of the University of Vienna, where he carried out studies on cervical cancer and developed his eponymous test. He published this work in German in 1927 and in English in 1933, and wrote one of the earliest papers on dysgerminoma in 1934. Schiller travelled extensively during the 1930s, lecturing in England, Dublin and the United States.

In 1937 he emigrated to the United States with his wife and two daughters due to the threat of Nazism, working initially at the Jewish Memorial Hospital in New York City. He became Director of Pathology at the Cook County Hospital, Chicago in 1938, and started publishing on ovarian tumours in 1939. He described yolk sac tumours, and the Schiller-Duval bodies which had previously been described in rats by Mathias-Marie Duval.
