= Testicular microlithiasis =

- Symptoms: Though generally asymptomatic, in extremely rare cases (likely <0.1-0.5% of cases) those with the condition may experience chronic fatigue, depression, hormone imbalance, pain and swelling in the testicular region and in more severe cases calcification of the prostate which can result in the painful passing of stones.
- Duration: This is a lifelong condition
- Diagnostic method: Testicular ultrasound
- Frequency: Highly uncommon - extremely rare (depending on symptoms)

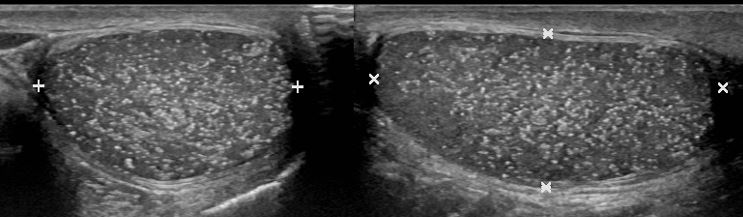
testicular microlithiasis on ultrasound

Testicular microlithiasis is an unusual condition diagnosed on testicular ultrasound. It is believed to be found in 0.1–0.5% of males globally, with frequency varying based on geographic location and is more often found in individuals with subfertility. It is often an asymptomatic, non-progressive disease; though in a very small number of cases it may also cause bouts of extreme chronic fatigue, hormone imbalance and pain, which can be severe and accompanied by swelling around the testicular region (dependent on the size and location of the calcification). In an extremely rare select few cases, individuals with microlithiasis have also been known to experience calcification of the prostate, which can lead to the passing of stones. These rare cases can lead to secondary infections if not treated with care, due to the resulting damaged tissue. However, these symptoms are rarely seen in the majority of people who have been diagnosed.

Testicular microlithiasis is not associated with risk of testicular cancer in asymptomatic individuals, except in individuals who experience symptoms. However, a large meta-analysis has shown that in individuals with associated risk factors for testicular germ cell tumor, the increase in risk of concurrent diagnosis of testicular germ cell tumor, or testicular carcinoma-in-situ upon biopsy is approximately eight to ten-fold.

There is extensive controversy over whether testicular microlithiasis in individuals with testicular germ cell tumor, or risk factors for such, should undergo testicular biopsy to exclude the presence of testicular carcinoma in situ, also known as intratubular germ cell neoplasia of unclassified type. Additionally, whether the presence of testicular microlithiasis should influence decision for adjuvant chemotherapy or surveillance in individuals with testicular germ cell tumor remains unclear. A recent review in Nature Reviews Urology has comprehensively evaluated these topics. However, as with any condition, symptoms can vary from individual to individual.

== Cause ==
The cause is unknown, but this condition has been associated with testicular cancer in a small group of individuals, cryptorchidism, mumps, infertility and intraepithelial germ cell neoplasia. Classic testicular microlithiasis is defined as five or more echogenic foci per view in either or both testes, and limited testicular microlithiasis defined as one or more echogenic foci that do not satisfy the criteria for classic testicular microlithiasis. In 80% of cases, both testicles are affected.

== Diagnosis ==
Testicular ultrasound

== Management ==
There is no cure or treatment for testicular microlithiasis, however, patients may be monitored via ultrasound to make sure that other conditions do not develop, and in symptomatic cases, pain management may be required. Emphasis on testicular examination is the recommended follow up for asymptomatic men incidentally identified with testicular microlithiasis. For men with risk factors for testicular germ cell tumor such as subfertility however, individualized discussion with their urologists is necessary.
