= Growing teratoma syndrome =

- Specialty: Urology
- Treatment: Retroperitoneal lymph node dissection

Growing teratoma syndrome is a rare complication of teratoma that can occur when an immature testicular or ovarian germ cell teratoma is treated by chemotherapy.

The masses are benign, but can grow quickly. They are usually found in the retroperitoneum but can be in the lung, cervical lymph nodes, mediastinum, supraclavicular lymph nodes, inguinal lymph nodes, forearm, mesentery, liver, and pineal gland.

== Diagnosis ==
Diagnosis is based on:

- normal serum tumor markers (alpha fetoprotein and human chorionic gonadotropin)
- new or growing masses after chemotherapy for nonseminomatous germ cell tumors
- only mature teratoma is found in the specimen removed from the patient.

== Treatment ==
Treatment is by retroperitoneal lymph node dissection.
