= Retroperitoneal lymph node dissection =

Surgical procedure to remove abdominal lymph nodes

- Specialty: Urologic oncology

Retroperitoneal lymph node dissection (RPLND) is a surgical procedure to remove abdominal lymph nodes. It is used to treat testicular cancer, as well as to help establish the exact stage and type of the cancer.

== Indications ==
Testicular cancer metastasizes in a predictable pattern, and lymph nodes in the retroperitoneum are typically the first place it lands. By examining the removed lymphatic tissue, a pathologist can determine whether the disease has spread. If no malignant tissue is found, the cancer can be labeled Stage I, limited to the testicle.

The procedure is common in the treatment of Stage I and II non-seminomatous germ cell tumors. In seminomas, another form of testicular cancer, radiation therapy is generally preferred to the invasive RPLND procedure.

Whether RPLND is needed after orchiectomy depends on the type of tumor and its stage. RPLND may be performed to remove tumor remnants that persist after chemotherapy, because these remnants might otherwise spread and become resistant to the chemotherapy agents previously used.

Chemotherapy may be administered before RPLND and, if successful, may render surgery unnecessary. However, if the cancer does recur, surgery is much more difficult in a patient previously treated with chemotherapy.

== Procedure ==
RPLND is usually performed using an incision that extends from the sternum to several inches below the navel. A less invasive procedure (L-RPLND) can be performed laparoscopically, but this is more costly and time-consuming, and requires specialized equipment that not every hospital has. Additionally, it is unclear whether L-RPLND is as effective as the standard, open procedure.

== Complications ==
Potential complications of RPLND include damage to the sympathetic nerves running parallel to the spinal cord, which can result in retrograde ejaculation and infertility. In most cases nerve sparing is feasible leading to reduced rates of retrograde ejaculation. However, prior chemotherapy or very large residual masses may make nerve sparing challenging. Contrary to popular belief, erectile function is not compromised by RPLND because the nerves responsible for erection are located elsewhere.

As with any major surgery, infection is a possibility, as are bowel obstructions and adhesions.

== See also ==
- Growing teratoma syndrome
