= List of medical abbreviations: Y =

Abbreviation	Meaning
y	year or years
YO yo y/o	years old
YPLL	years of potential life lost
YST	yolk sac tumor
yr	year or years
