= Immature teratoma =

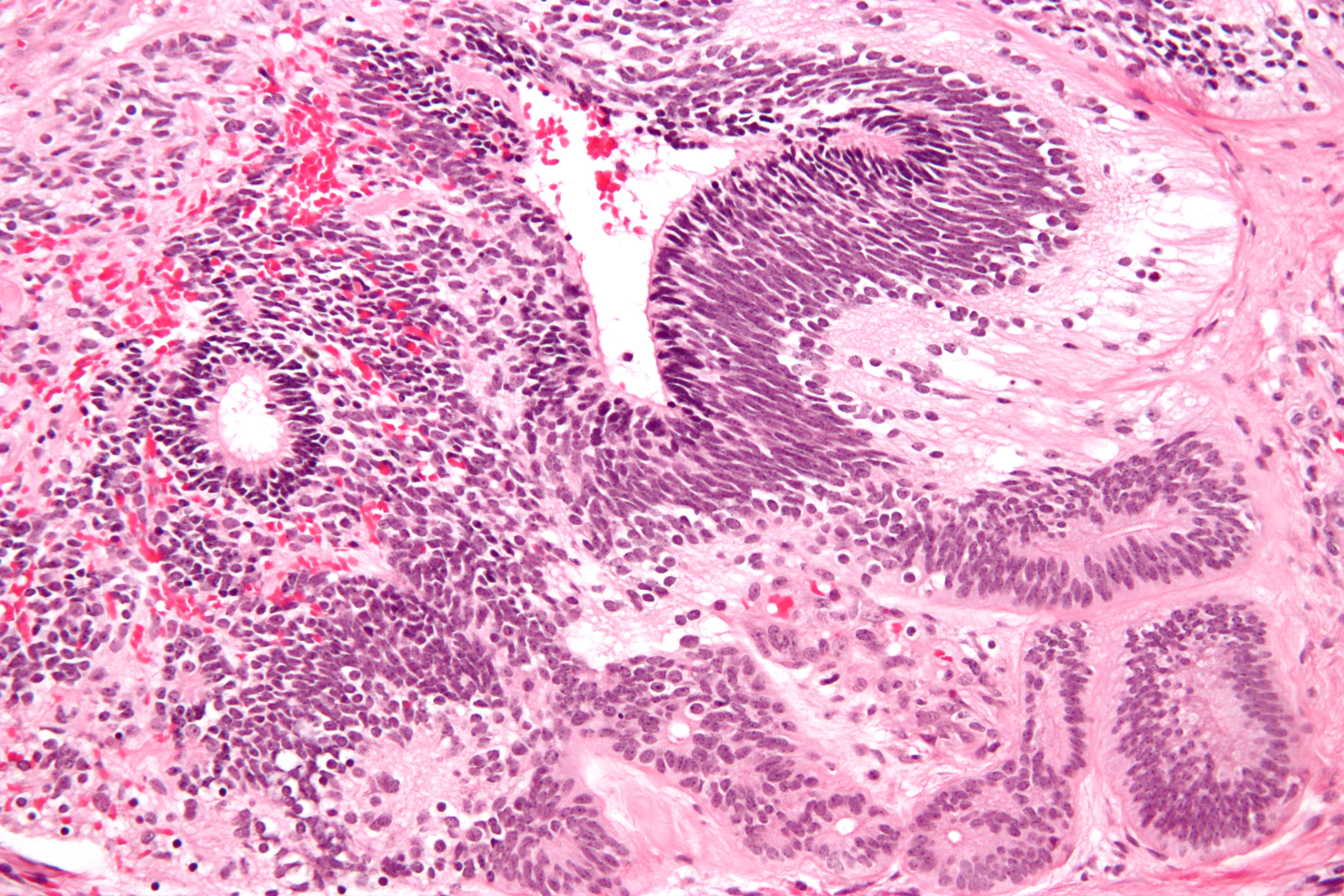
- Micrograph of the primitive neuroepithelium of an immature teratoma. H&E stain.
- Specialty: Oncology

An immature teratoma is a teratoma that contains anaplastic immature elements, and is often synonymous with malignant teratoma. A teratoma is a tumor of germ cell origin, containing tissues from more than one germ cell line, It can be ovarian or testicular in its origin. and are almost always benign. An immature teratoma is thus a very rare tumor, representing 1% of all teratomas, 1% of all ovarian cancers, and 35.6% of malignant ovarian germ cell tumors. It displays a specific age of incidence, occurring most frequently in the first two decades of life and almost never after menopause. Unlike a mature cystic teratoma, an immature teratoma contains immature or embryonic structures. It can coexist with mature cystic teratomas and can constitute of a combination of both adult and embryonic tissue. The most common symptoms noted are abdominal distension and masses. Prognosis and treatment options vary and largely depend on grade, stage and karyotype of the tumor itself.

== Diagnosis ==
At CT and MRI, an immature teratoma possesses characteristic appearance. It is typically large (12–25 cm) and has prominent solid components with cystic elements. It is usually filled with lipid constituents and therefore demonstrates fat density at CT and MRI. Ultrasound appearance of an immature teratoma is nonspecific. It is highly heterogeneous with partially solid lesions and scattered calcifications.

=== Stage ===
Traditionally, comprehensive surgical staging is performed via exploratory laparotomy with cytologic washings, peritoneal biopsies, an omental assessment (either biopsy or rarely a full omentectomy), and both pelvic and aortic lymph node dissection. Laproscopy is often suggested as an alternative to surgically stage patients with immature teratoma.

Ovarian cancer is staged using the FIGO staging system and uses information obtained after surgery, which can include a total abdominal hysterectomy via midline laparotomy, unilateral (or bilateral) salpingo-oophorectomy, pelvic (peritoneal) washings, assessment of retroperitoneal lymph nodes and/or appendectomy. The AJCC staging system, identical to the FIGO staging system, describes the extent of tumor (T), the presence of absences of metastases to lymph nodes (N), the presence or absence of distant metastases (M).

Table 1: FIGO Staging System for Ovarian Cancers
Stage				Description
I				Cancer is completely limited to the ovary
	IA			involves one ovary, capsule intact, no tumor on ovarian surface, negative washings
	IB			involves both ovaries; capsule intact; no tumor on ovarian surface; negative washings
	IC			tumor involves one or both ovaries
	IC1			surgical spill
	IC2			capsule has ruptured or tumor on ovarian surface
	IC3			positive ascites or washings
II				pelvic extension of the tumor (must be confined to the pelvis) or primary peritoneal tumor, involves one or both ovaries
	IIA			tumor found on uterus or fallopian tubes
	IIB			tumor elsewhere in the pelvis
III				cancer found outside the pelvis or in the retroperitoneal lymph nodes, involves one or both ovaries
	IIIA			metastasis in retroperitoneal lymph nodes or microscopic extrapelvic metastasis
		IIIA1		metastasis in retroperitoneal lymph nodes
			IIIA1(i)	the metastasis is less than 10 mm in diameter
			IIIA1(ii)	the metastasis is greater than 10 mm in diameter
		IIIA2		microscopic metastasis in the peritoneum, regardless of retroperitoneal lymph node status
	IIIB			metastasis in the peritoneum less than or equal to 2 cm in diameter, regardless of retroperitoneal lymph node status; or metastasis to liver or spleen capsule
	IIIC			metastasis in the peritoneum greater than 2 cm in diameter, regardless of retroperitoneal lymph node status; or metastasis to liver or spleen capsule
IV				distant metastasis (i.e. outside of the peritoneum)
	IVA			pleural effusion containing cancer cells
	IVB			metastasis to distant organs (including the parenchyma of the spleen or liver), or metastasis to the inguinal and extra-abdominal lymph nodes

=== Pathology ===
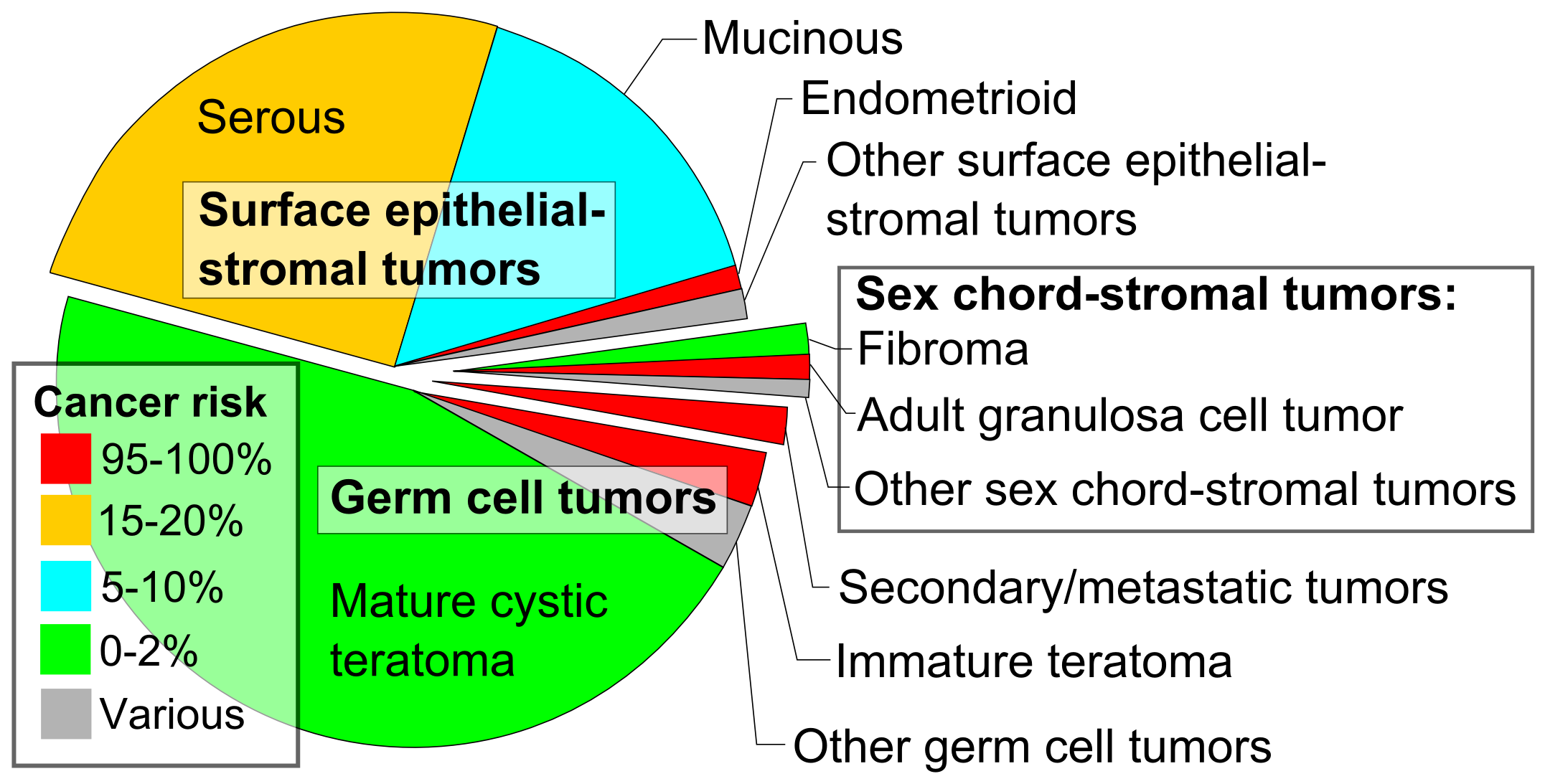
Ovarian tumors by incidence and risk of ovarian cancer, with immature teratoma at right.

An immature teratoma contains varying compositions of adult and embryonic tissue. The most common embryonic component identified in immature teratomas is the neuroectoderm. Occasionally, tumors may present neuroepithelium that resembles neuroblasts. Tumors may also present embryonic components such as immature cartilage and skeletal muscle of mesodermal origin. Immature teratomas composed of embryonic endodermal derivatives are rare.

Often a mature cystic teratoma is misdiagnosed as its immature counterpart due to the misinterpretation of mature neural tissue as immature. While mature neural cells have nuclei with uniformly dense chromatin and neither exhibit apoptotic or mitotic activity, immature neural cells have nuclei with vesicular chromatin and exhibit both apoptotic and mitotic activity. A recent study has identified the use of Oct-4 as a reliable biomarker for the diagnosis of highly malignant cases of immature teratomas.

=== Grade ===
Thurlbeck and Scully devised a grading system for "pure" immature teratomas on the basis of differentiation of the cellular elements of the tumor. The proportion of immature tissue elements defines the grade of immaturity. This was later modified by Norris et al. (1976), who added a quantitative aspect to the degree of immaturity.

Table 2: Identifying Tumor Grade in Immature Teratomas
Grade	Thurlbeck and Scully (1960)	Norris et al. (1976)
0	All cells are well differentiated	All cells are mature; mitotic activity is rare or absent.
1	Cells are well differentiated except in rare small foci of embryonic tissue; neuroepithelium is absent or rare	Neuroepithelium absent or limited to fewer than one low-magnification field (x40) per slide
2	Moderate quantities of embryonic tissue present; cells show atypicality and mitotic activity	Neuroepithelium does not exceed more than three low-magnification fields (x40) per slide
3	Large quantities of embryonic tissue present; cells show atypicality and mitotic activity	Neuroepithelium exceeds more than three low-magnification fields (x40) per slide

=== Karyotype ===
An ovarian immature teratoma is karyotypically normal 46,XX or near-normal. Grade 1 or 2 tumors exhibit 46,XX normal karyotype, whereas grade 3 tumors show a variety of abnormal karyotypes. Though immature teratoma cells show a normal karyotype, there may still be detectable alterations in the gene level and that these aberrations may influence the stability of chromosome status.

== Genetics ==
Ovarian immature teratomas have been classified as among the least mutated of all solid cancers. Immature teratomas originate from germ cells that undergo one of several meiotic failures, leading to a tumor genome with high levels of copy neutral loss of heterozygosity.

== Prognosis ==
Though several studies have shown that size and stage of the primary tumor are related to survival, the grade of the tumor is the best determinant of prognosis prior to peritoneal spread. Once peritoneal spread has occurred, the grade of metastatic lesions or implants is the best determinant of prognosis. Multiple sections of the primary tumor and wide sampling of the implants are necessary to properly grade the tumor. In most cases, the implants are better differentiated than the primary tumors. Gliomatosis peritonei, a rare condition often associated with immature ovarian teratoma, is characterized by the presence of mature glial implants in the peritoneum. Yoon et al. (2012), reported that immature ovarian teratoma patients with Gliomatosis peritonei have larger tumors, more frequent recurrence and higher CA-125 levels than immature ovarian teratoma patients without gliomatosis peritonei.

A high degree of immaturity in the primary tumor, one that corresponds with a grade 3 diagnosis is a sign of poor prognosis. Grade 3 tumors often display chromosomal abnormalities, also an indication of poor prognosis. Tumor grade is the most important factor for relapse in immature teratomas. Vicus et al. (2011), reported that grade 2 or 3 tumors are associated with a greater chance of relapse that can be fatal, predominantly within 2 years of diagnosis. Among grade 3 patients, the stage was significantly associated with relapse.

In the past, survival rates were low for high-grade immature teratomas. Norris et al. (1976), reported a survival rate of 82% for patients with grade 1 tumors, 62% for grade 2 and 30% for grade 3 tumors. However, these results antedate the use of multi-agent chemotherapy. With the advent of multiagent chemotherapy after surgical resection, long-term remission and increased survival rates have been achieved. Pashankar et al. (2016), reported that the estimated 5-year overall survival rate for grade 3 Stage I and II disease was 91% compared with 88% for grade 3, Stage III and IV disease.

== Treatment ==
Histologic grade and fertility desires of the patient are key considerations in determining treatment options. In adult women postoperative adjuvant chemotherapy is standard except for stage I /grade 1 disease. In pediatric patients, surgery alone is standard.

=== Surgery ===
Since the occurrence of immature teratoma is very rarely bilateral, current standard of care of unilateral salpingo-oophorectomy with wide sampling of peritoneal implants. Total abdominal hysterectomy with bilateral salpingo-oophorectomy are not indicated as they do not influence outcomes. Fertility-sparing surgery in the form of unilateral salpingo-oophorectomy is the primary treatment modality in young patients. Some physicians recommend ovarian cystectomy alone, rather than a unilateral salpingo-oophorectomy for patients with an early stage low grade disease. Zhao et al. (2017), reported no significant differences in survival rates or post-operative fertility outcomes between the two treatment options. However, others caution against such an approach.

=== Chemotherapy ===
Norris et al. (1976) observed an 18% recurrence rate in grade 2 tumors and 70% recurrence in grade 3 tumors. Gershenson et al. (1986), reported outcomes of 41 patients with Stage I-IV disease and observed recurrences in 94% of patients treated with surgery alone compared with 14% in patients treated with surgery and chemotherapy. Studies like these resulted in the recommendation to use chemotherapy for grade 2 and 3 tumors. Currently, the use of multi agent chemotherapy for adult patients with ovarian immature teratoma is standard of care except for grade 1, stage I tumors. There is considerable experience with a combination of vincristine, dactinomycin, and cyclophosphamide (VAC) given in an adjuvant setting; however, combinations containing cisplatin, etoposide, and bleomycin (BEP) are now preferred because of a lower relapse rate and shorter treatment time. While a prospective comparison of VAC versus BEP has not been performed, in well-staged patients with completely resected tumors, relapse is essentially unheard of following platinum-based chemotherapy. However, the disease will recur in about 25% of well-staged patients treated with 6 months of VAC.

== See also ==
- Teratoma
- Ovarian Cancer
- Germ Cell Tumor
