= Embryonal carcinoma =

Relatively uncommon type of germ cell tumour

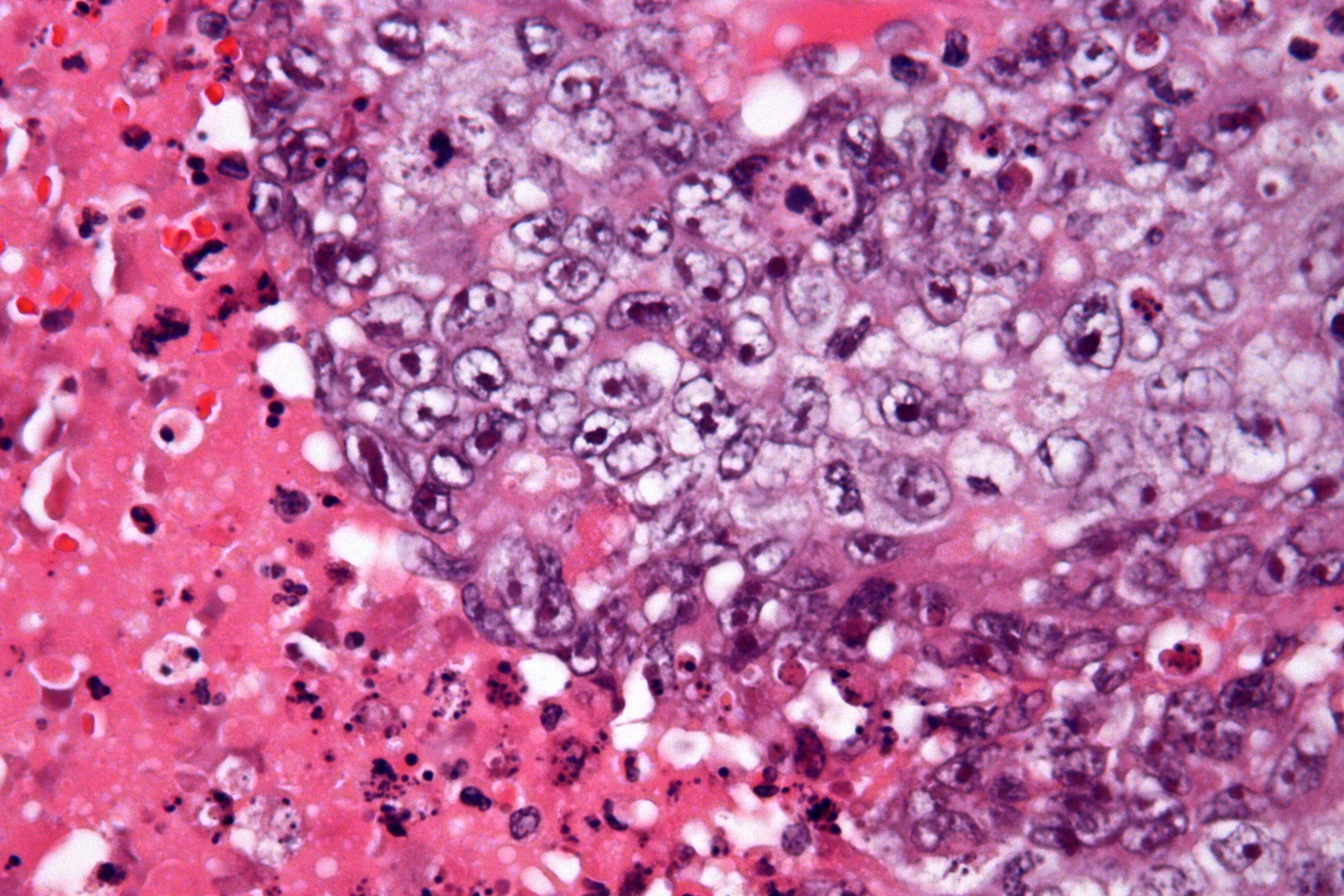
- Micrograph of an embryonal carcinoma showing its typical features – prominent nucleoli, marked nuclear atypia, necrosis, and nuclear overlap. H&E stain.
- Specialty: Urology, gynecology

Embryonal carcinoma is a relatively uncommon type of nonseminomatous germ cell tumour that occurs in the ovaries and testes.

== Signs and symptoms ==
The presenting features may be a palpable testicular mass or asymmetric testicular enlargement in some cases. The tumour may present as signs and symptoms relating to the presence of widespread metastases, without any palpable lump in the testis. The clinical features associated with metastasising embryonal carcinoma may include low back pain, dyspnoea, cough, haemoptysis, haematemesis and neurologic abnormalities.

Males with pure embryonal carcinoma tend to have a normal amount of the protein alpha-fetoprotein in the fluid component of their blood. The finding of elevated amounts of alpha-fetoprotein is more suggestive of a yolk sac tumour component.

== Diagnosis ==
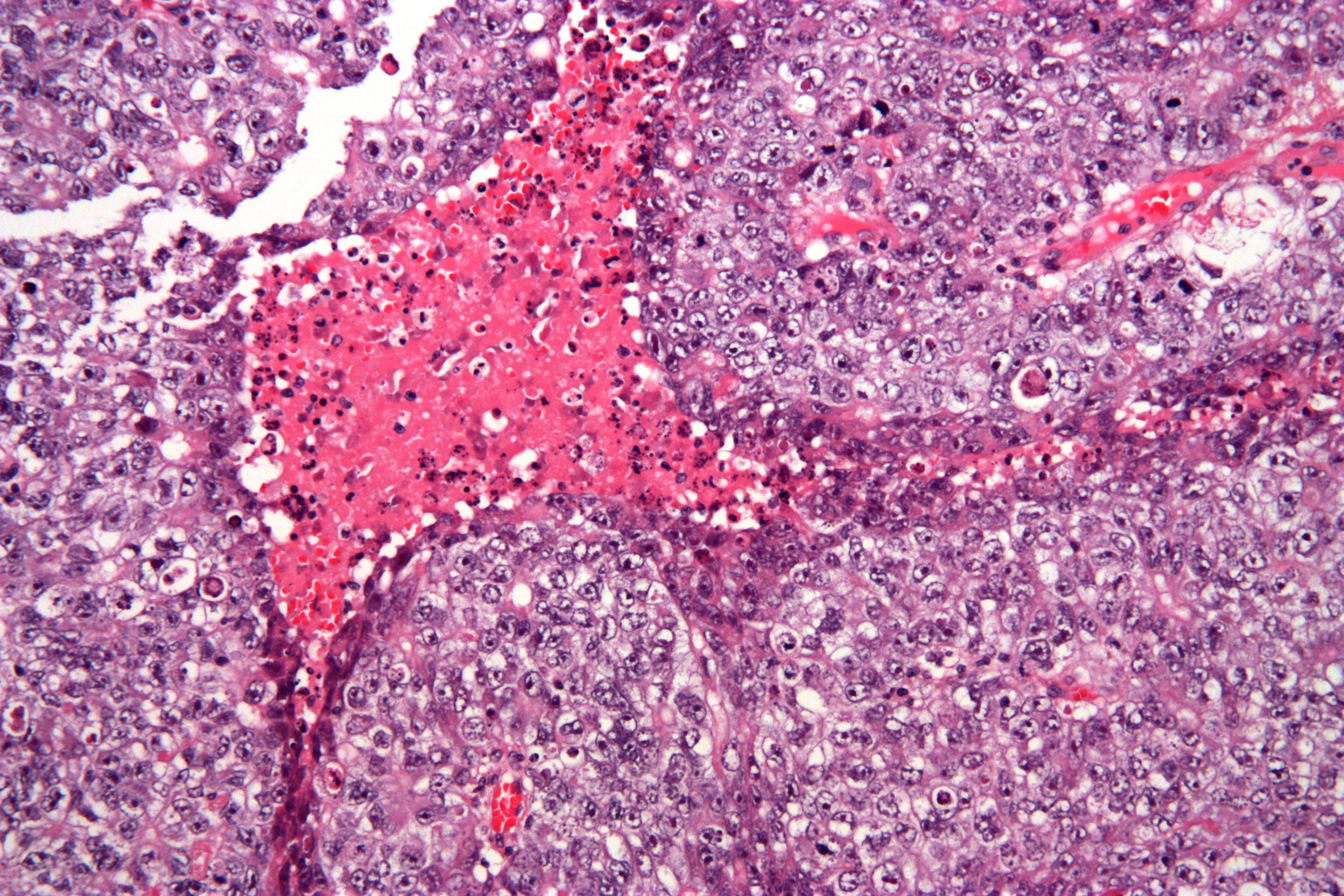
Embryonal carcinoma. H&E stain.

The gross examination usually shows a two to three centimetre pale grey, poorly defined tumour with associated haemorrhage and necrosis.

The microscopic features include: indistinct cell borders, mitoses, a variable architecture (tubulopapillary, glandular, solid, embryoid bodies – ball of cells surrounded by empty space on three sides), nuclear overlap, and necrosis.

Solid (55%), glandular (17%), and papillary (11%) are the most common primary patterns (predominant architectural pattern occupying at least 50%). Other less common primary patterns included nested (3%), micropapillary (2%), anastomosing glandular (1%), sieve-like glandular (<1%), pseudopapillary (<1%), and blastocyst-like (<1%).

Testicular embryonal carcinoma occurs mostly (84%) as a component of a mixed germ cell tumor, but 16% are pure. Occasionally, embryonal carcinoma develops predominantly in the context of polyembryoma-like (6%) and diffuse embryoma-like ("necklace" pattern) (3%) proliferations.

=== Ovarian ===
In the ovary, embryonal carcinoma is quite rare, amounting to approximately three percent of ovarian germ cell tumours. The median age at diagnosis is 15 years. Symptoms and signs are varied, and may include sexual precocity and abnormal (increased, reduced or absent) uterine bleeding.

There may be elevations in serum human chorionic gonadotropin (hCG) and alpha fetoprotein (AFP) levels but it would be in association with other tumors, (e.g. yolk sac tumor) because they themselves do not produce the serum markers. At surgery, there is extension of the tumour beyond the ovary in forty percent of cases. They are generally large, unilateral tumours, with a median diameter of 17 centimetres. Long-term survival has improved following the advent of chemotherapy. The gross and histologic features of this tumour are similar to that seen in the testis.

=== Testicular ===
In the testis pure embryonal carcinoma is also uncommon, and accounts for approximately ten percent of testicular germ cell tumours. However, it is present as a component of almost ninety percent of mixed nonseminomatous germ cell tumours. The average age at diagnosis is 31 years, and typically presents as a testicular lump which may be painful. One-fifth to two-thirds of patients with tumours composed predominantly of embryonal carcinoma have metastases at diagnosis.

=== Differential diagnosis ===
An important key to distinguish it from other tumors, such as seminoma (vacuolated), teratocarcinoma (three differentiated germ layers), yolk sac tumor (Schiller–Duval bodies), and the Sertoli–Leydig cell tumor (strings of glands), is that the embryonal carcinoma cells are "trying" to evolve into their next stage of development. So in the testicle, they are often observed as blue cells attempting to form primitive tubules.
