= Mathias-Marie Duval =

French professor of anatomy and histology

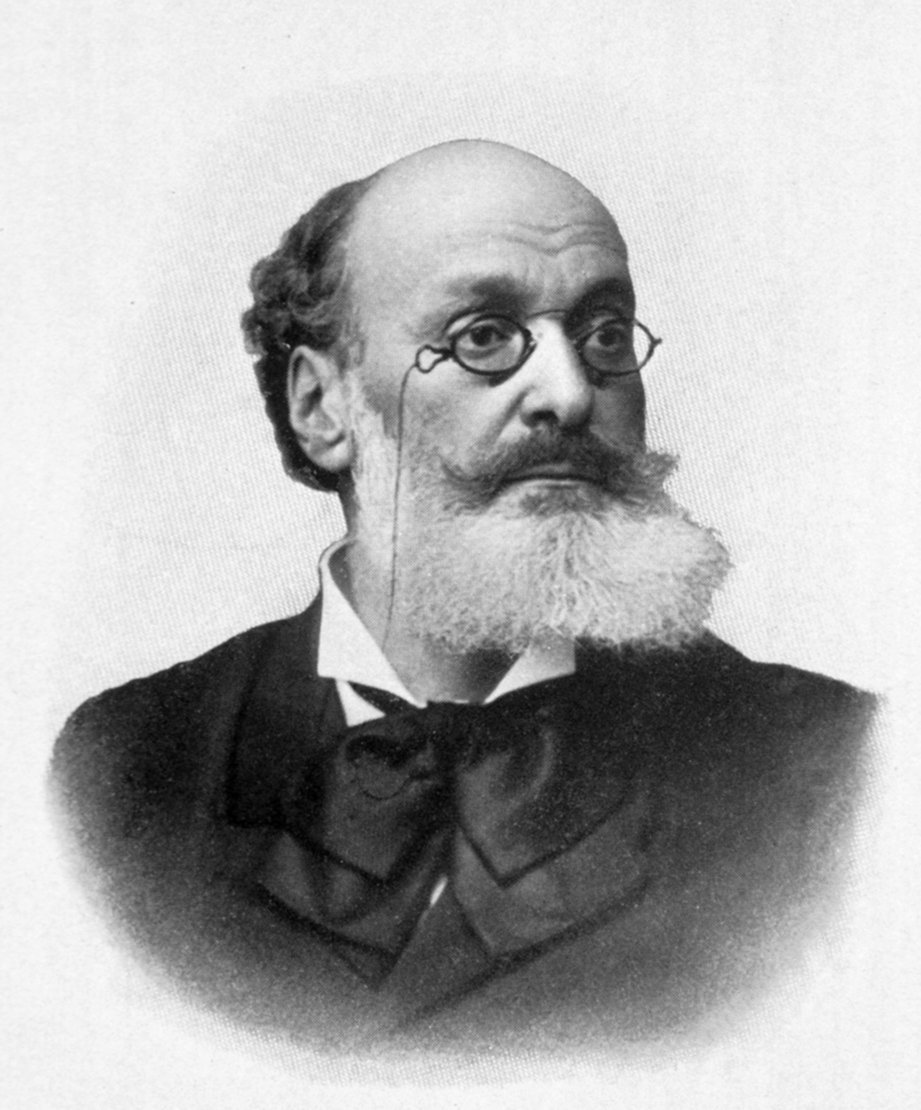
Mathias-Marie Duval

Mathias-Marie Duval (7 February 1844 – 28 February 1907) was a French professor of anatomy and histology born in Grasse. He was the son of botanist Joseph Duval-Jouve (1810–1883).

== Biography ==
He studied medicine in Paris, and later served as prosector in Strassburg. In 1873 he became agrégé, subsequently becoming director of the anthropological laboratory at the École des Hautes Etudes and an anatomy professor at the École nationale supérieure des beaux-arts. In 1885 he replaced Charles-Philippe Robin (1821–1895) as professor of histology at the medical faculty in Paris. In 1892 he became a member of the Académie de Médecine. He was also a member of the International Society for the History of Medicine.

Duval is remembered for research involving placental development in mice and rats, and was the first to identify trophoblast invasion in rodents. With Austrian-American gynecologist Walter Schiller (1887–1960), Schiller Duval bodies are named, which are structures found in endodermal sinus tumors.

== Selected writings ==
- Sur la structure et usages de la rétine. Thesis for agrégé- 1873
- Manuel du microscopie. 1873, second edition- 1877.
- Précis de technique microscopique et histologique, ou introduction pratique à l’anatomie générale. (with an introduction by Charles-Philippe Robin). Paris, J.-B. Baillière et fils, 1878. 315 pages.
- Précis de l'anatomie à l'usage des artistes, 1881.
- Leçons sur la physiologie du système nerveux, 1883.
- Le placenta des rongeurs. Journal de l'anatomie et de la physiologie normales et pathologiques de l'homme et des animaux, Paris, 1891, 27: 24–73, 344–395, 513–612.
- Le placenta des rongeurs. Paris, Felix Alcan, 1892.
- Précis d'histologie, Paris, 1897, 1900.
- Histoire d'anatomie plastique: les maîtres, les livres et les échorchès, (With Edouard Coyer). Paris: Picard & Kann, 1898.

== Honors ==
In 1897, Duval was named an honorary member of the American Association for Anatomy.

== See also ==
- A Clinical Lesson at the Salpêtrière – 1887 group tableau portrait by André Brouillet
