= Schiller's test =

Medical test to diagnose cervical cancer

- Purpose: test for cervical cancer

Schiller's test or Schiller's Iodine test is a medical test in which iodine solution is applied to the cervix in order to diagnose cervical cancer.

== Procedure ==
Schiller's iodine solution is applied to the cervix under direct vision. Normal cervical mucosa contains glycogen and stains brown, whereas abnormal areas, such as early cervical cancer, do not take up the stain. The abnormal areas can then be biopsied and examined histologically. The composition of Schiller's iodine is the same as Lugol's iodine, the latter being more concentrated. When Schiller's iodine is not available, Lugol's iodine can be used as an alternative.

Schiller's test is not specific for cervical cancer, as areas of inflammation, ulceration and keratosis may also not take up the stain.

== Eponym ==
Schiller's test is named after Dr. Walter Schiller (1887 – 1960).
