= Schiller–Duval body =

Pathognomic of Yolk sac tumor ovary

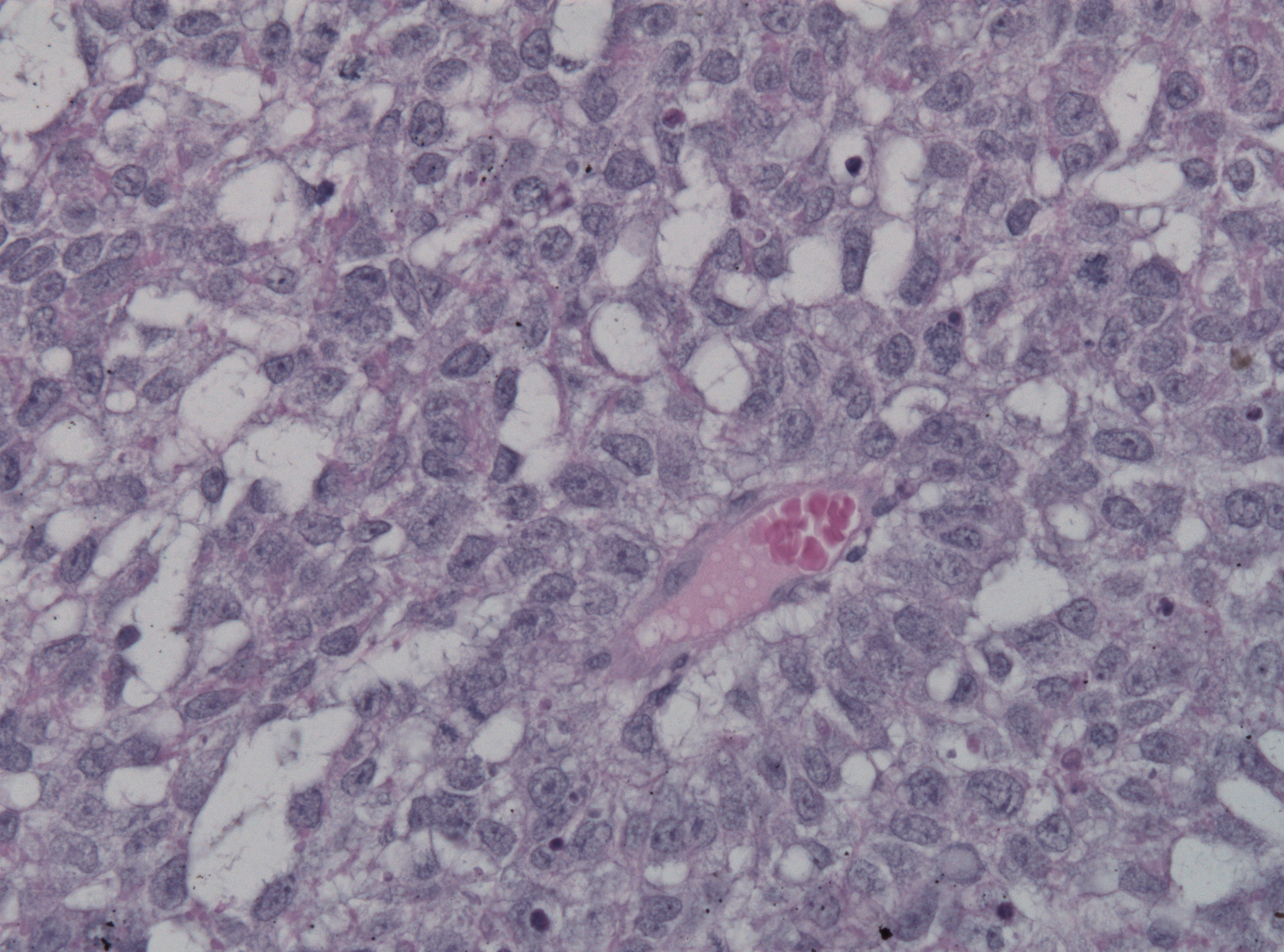
Biopsy specimen of yolk sac tumor with Schiller-Duval body, H&E stain

Schiller–Duval body is a cellular structure seen by microscope in endodermal sinus tumors (yolk sac tumors) which are the most common testicular cancer in children. Schiller-Duval bodies are present in approximately 50% of these tumors, and if found are pathognomonic. They are named for Mathias-Marie Duval and Walter Schiller who described them in the late nineteenth century.

Schiller–Duval bodies are said to resemble a glomerulus. They have a mesodermal core with a central capillary, all lined by flattened layers of both visceral and parietal cells. Immunofluorescent stain may show eosinophilic hyalin-like globules both inside and outside the cytoplasm that contain AFP and alpha 1-antitrypsin.

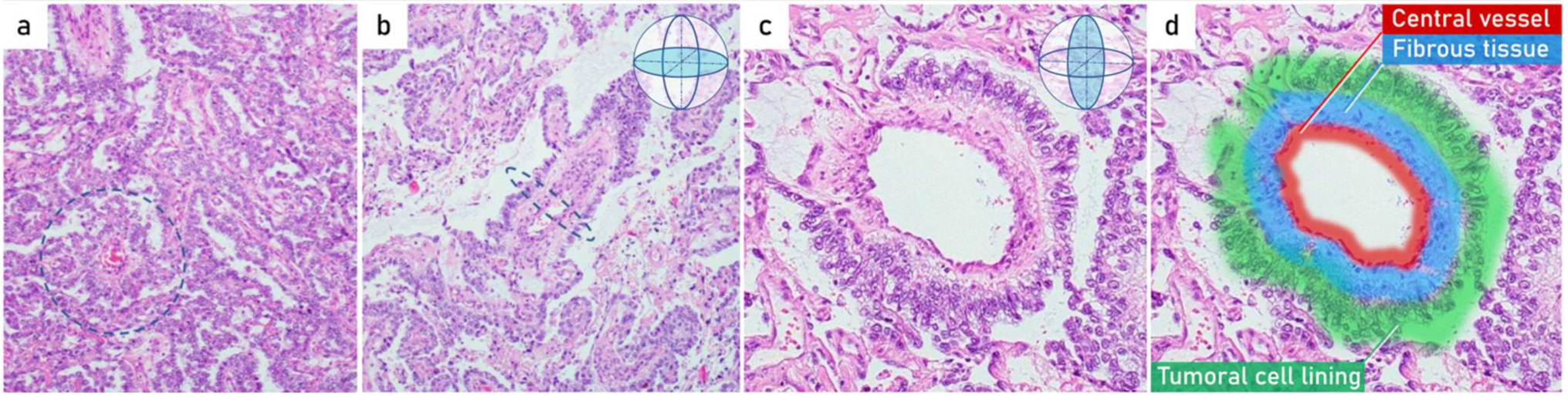
Histopathology of endodermal sinus tumor with Schiller–Duval bodies.
(a) papillary pattern combined with small tubopapillary endodermal sinus structure (Schiller–Duval body) in blue circle;
(b) marked tubulopapillary sinusoidal structure with central vascular core in longitudinal section (Schiller–Duval body);
(c,d) 400× g magnified image plus zoom of diagnostic round cystic Schiller–Duval body in a transverse section, with microcystic and papillary patterns around. The body has a central vessel surrounded by fibrous tissue, called the fibrovascular core, and it is surrounded by layers of the tumoral cells at the surface of that stalk. The structure is located in open cystic space also lined by tumoral cells. All those structures together are called a Schiller–Duval body and resemble primitive glomerulus. H&E stain.
