= Polyembryoma =

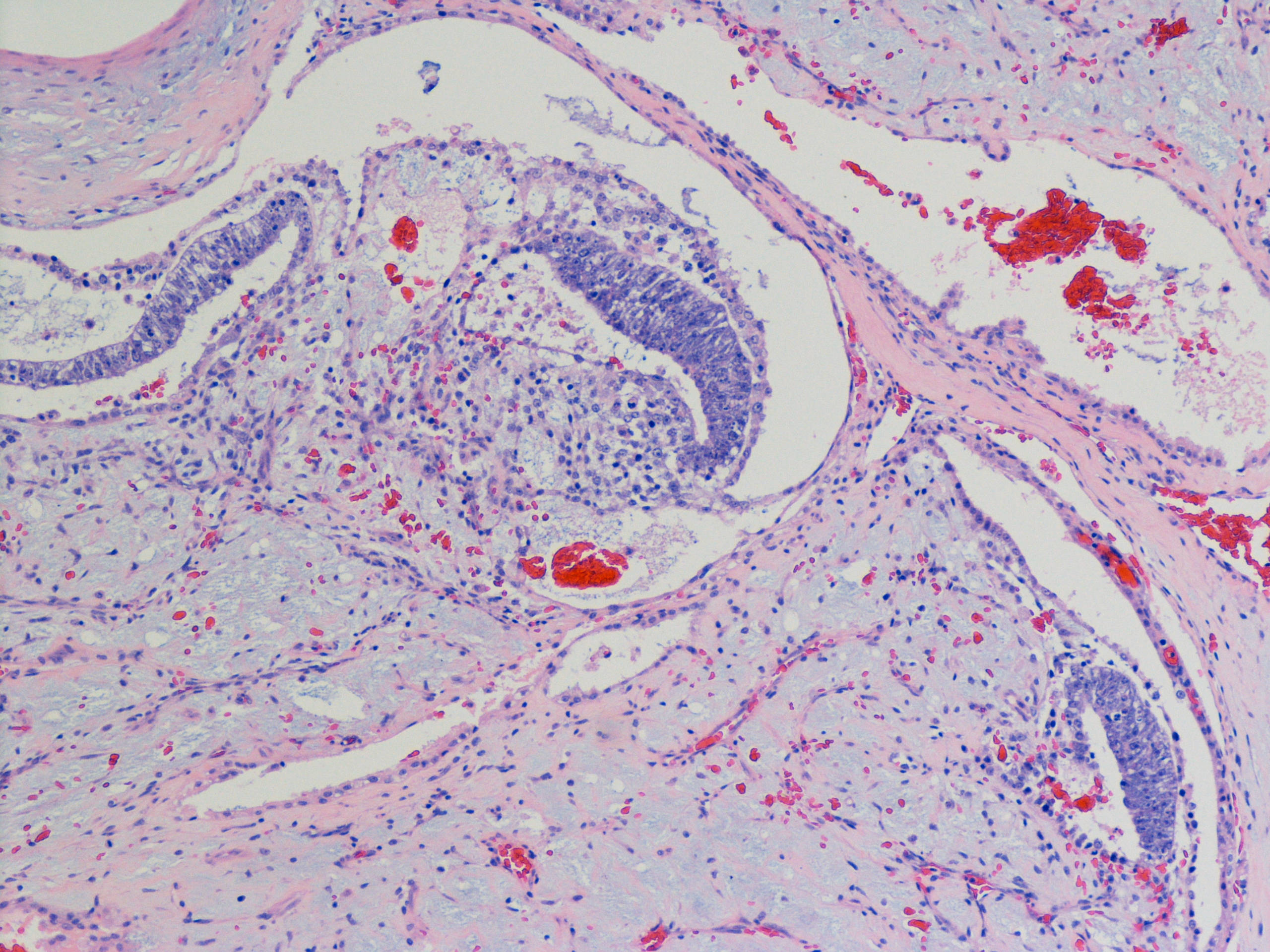
- Polyembryoma of the ovary, H&E stain
- Specialty: Oncology, gynecology

Polyembryoma is a rare, very aggressive form of germ cell tumor usually found in the ovaries. Polyembryoma has features of both yolk sac tumour and undifferentiated teratoma/embryonal carcinoma, with a characteristic finding of embryoid bodies lying in a loose mesenchymal stroma.

It has been found in association with Klinefelter syndrome.
