= Dysgerminoma =

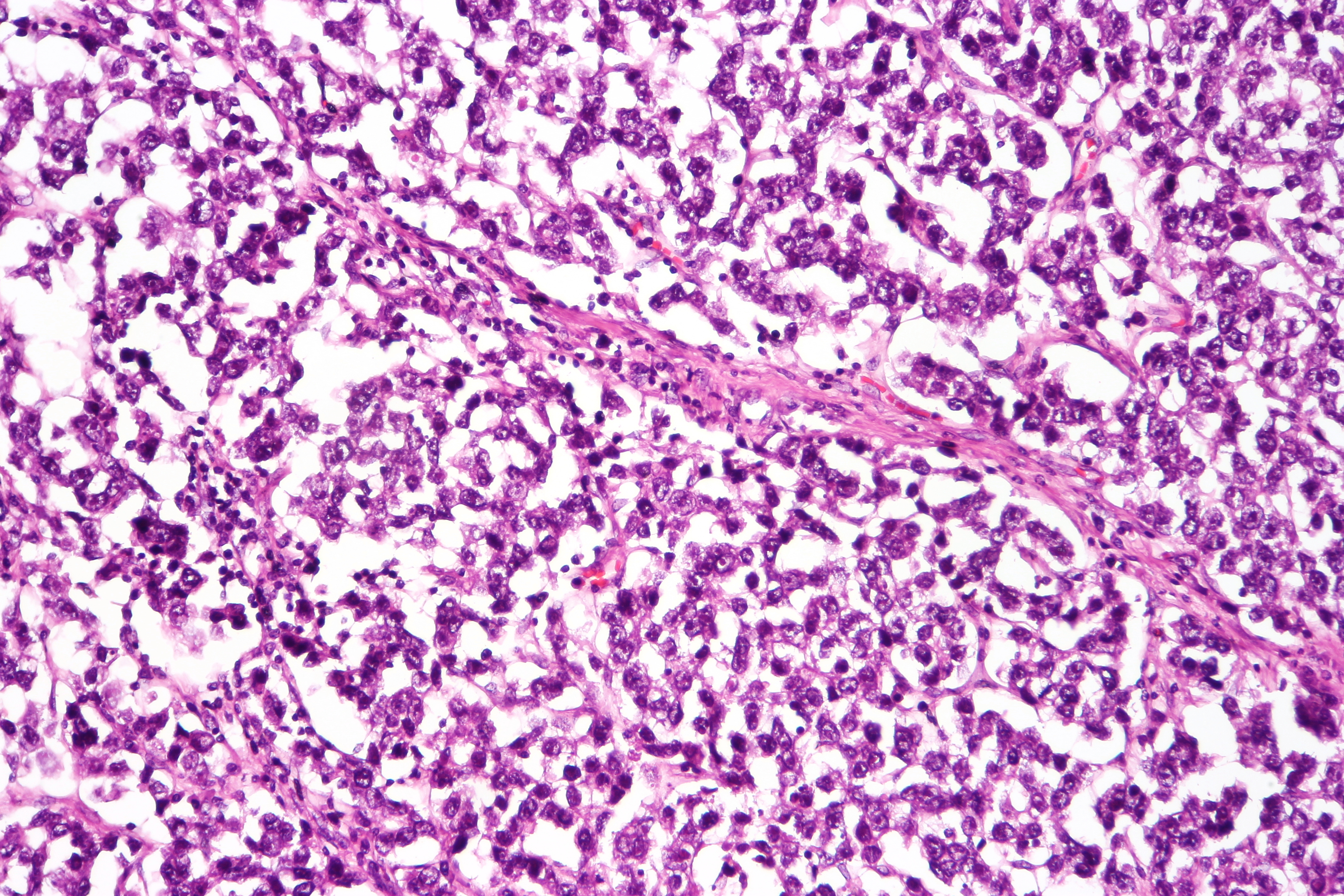
- Micrograph of a dysgerminoma, H&E stain.
- Specialty: Oncology, gynecology

A dysgerminoma is a type of germ cell tumor; it usually is malignant and usually occurs in the ovary.

A tumor of the identical histology but not occurring in the ovary may be described by an alternate name: seminoma in the testis or germinoma in the central nervous system or other parts of the body. Locations outside the ovaries such as the abdomen, fallopian tubes and uterus are rarely involved.

Dysgerminoma accounts for less than 1% of ovarian tumors overall. Dysgerminoma usually occurs in adolescence and early adult life; about 5% occur in pre-pubertal children. Dysgerminoma is extremely rare after age 50. Dysgerminoma occurs in both ovaries in 10% of patients and, in a further 10%, there is microscopic tumor in the other ovary.

Abnormal gonads (due to gonadal dysgenesis and androgen insensitivity syndrome) have a high risk of developing a dysgerminoma. Most dysgerminomas are associated with elevated serum lactic dehydrogenase, which is sometimes used as a tumor marker.

== Signs and symptoms ==
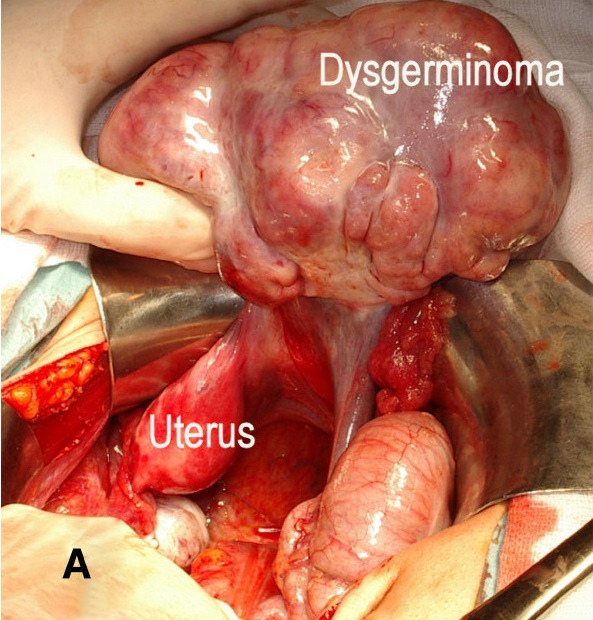
Excision of a dysgerminoma

Abdominal pain or distention is the most common presenting symptom. They are exceptionally associated with hypercalcemia. Paraneoplastic hypercalcemia mediated by ectopic 1,25-dihydroxyvitamin D production. Pseudo-Meigs Syndrome (PMS) may associated with dysgerminoma in exceedingly rare condition.PMS having clinical triad of a pelvic mass, massive ascites and hydrothorax/pleural effusion. Serum marker CA125 and β-hCG can be markedly elevated due to peritoneal irritation rather than primary tumor secretion. On gross examination, dysgerminomas present with a smooth, bosselated (knobby) external surface, and are soft, fleshy and either cream-coloured, gray, pink or tan when cut. Microscopic examination typically reveals uniform cells that resemble primordial germ cells. Typically, the stroma contains lymphocytes and about 20% of patients have sarcoid-like granulomas. Metastases are most often present in the lymph nodes.

== Molecular Genetics ==
At the molecular level, dysgerminomas closely resemble primordial germ cells, displaying a characteristic hypomethylated genomic profile. A key cytogenetic feature present in the majority of dysgerminomas is the presence of isochromosome 12p. Pathogenetically, dysgerminomas frequently harbor gain-of-function activating mutations in the c-KIT (CD117) receptor tyrosine kinase gene. Downstream activation of the RAS-MAPK and PI3K (phosphoinositide 3-kinase) cell-signaling pathways promotes the uncontrolled proliferation and survival of primitive germ cells. The tumor also exhibits high nuclear and cytoplasmic expression of pluripotency transcription factors including OCT3/4, SALL4, and SOX17.

== Diagnosis ==
Lactic dehydrogenase levels in the bloodstream are elevated in 95% of cases.

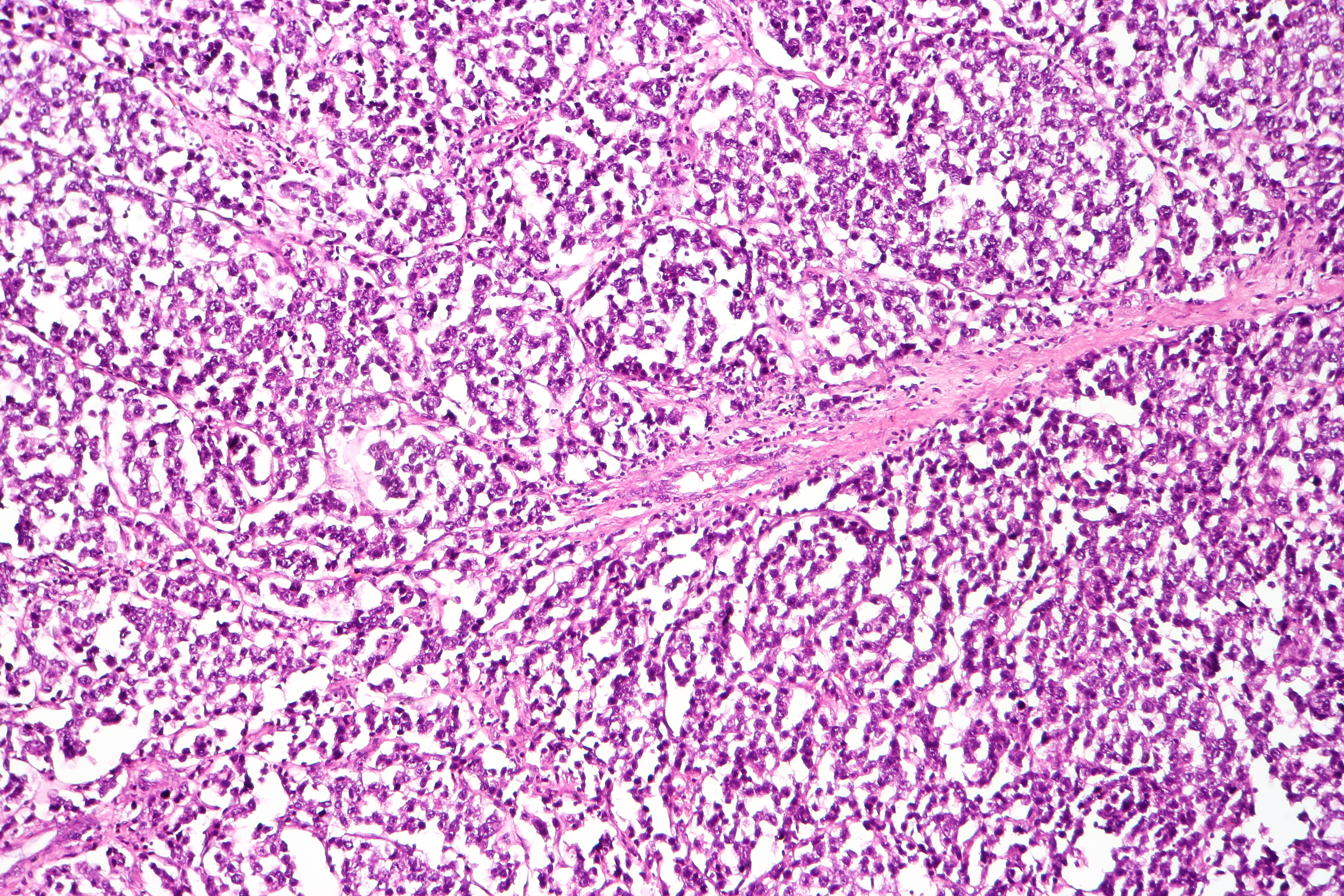
Dysgerminoma characterized by uniform cells separated by fibrous septa with lymphocytes, H&E stain.

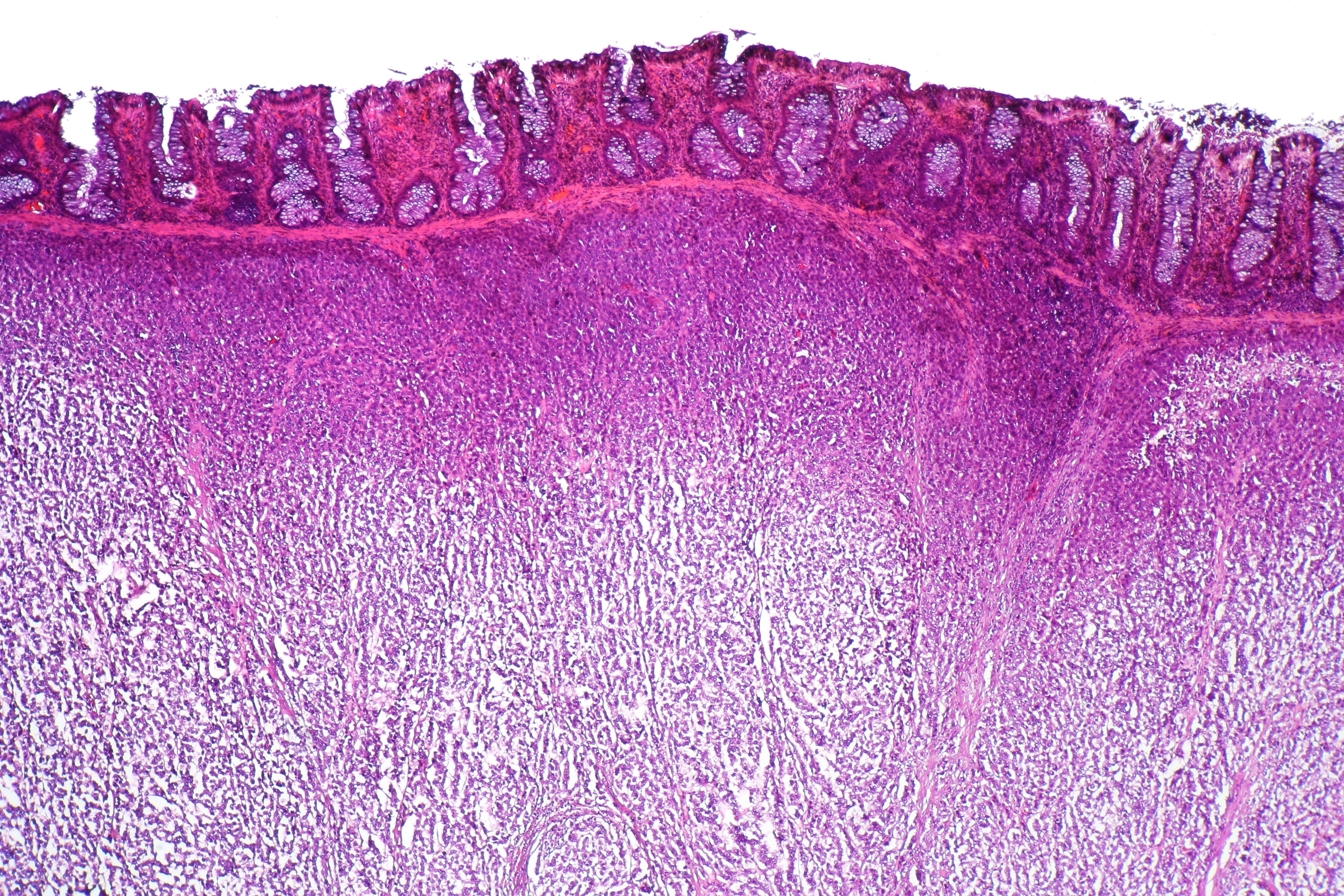
Low-power view of a dysgerminoma infiltrating the colonic wall, H&E stain.

== Treatment ==
Dysgerminomas, like other seminomatous germ cell tumors, are very sensitive to both chemotherapy and radiotherapy. For this reason, with treatment patients' chances of long-term survival, even cure, is excellent. Targeted treatments for dysgerminomas that do not respond to chemotherapy are being evaluated.
