= Germ cell tumor =

Germ-cell tumor
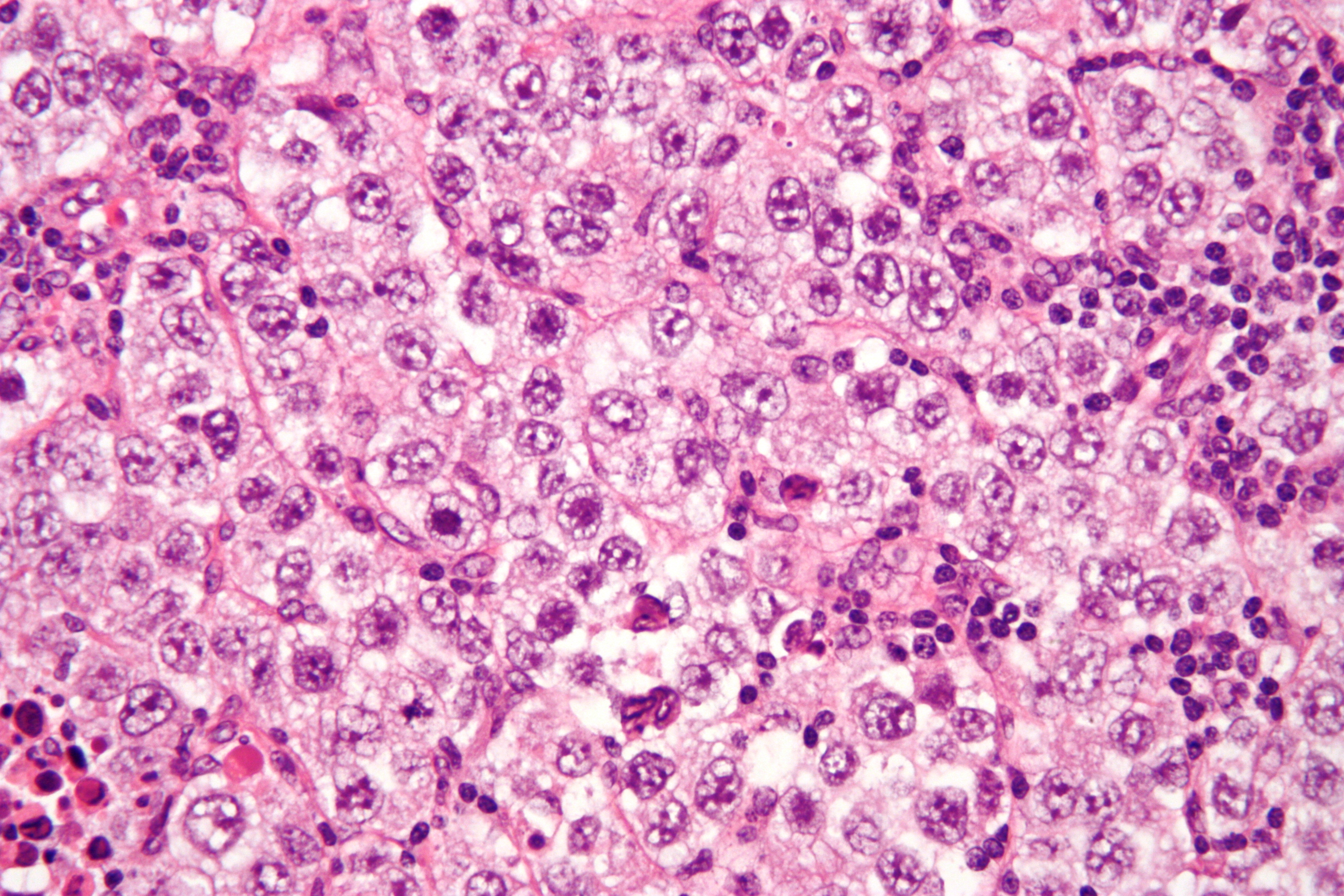
- Micrograph of a seminoma, a common germ cell tumor.
- Specialty: Oncology

A germ cell tumor (GCT) is a neoplasm derived from primordial germ cells. Germ-cell tumors can be cancerous or benign. Germ cell tumors typically originate from the gonads (ovary and testis), but can arise in other areas of the body. Extragonadal GCTs are thought to result from abnormal migration of germ cell precursors during development of the embryo.

== Classification ==
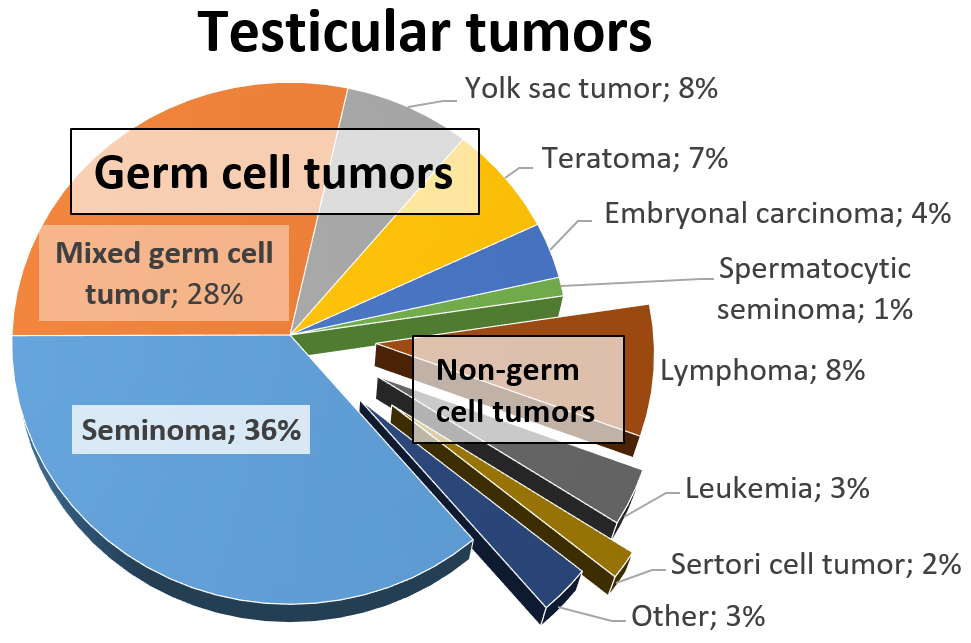
Germ cell tumors constitute a vast majority of the incidences of testicular tumors.

GCTs are classified by their histology, regardless of location in the body. However, as more information about the genetics of these tumors become available, they may be classified based on specific gene mutations that characterize specific tumors. They are broadly divided in two classes:

- The germinomatous or seminomatous germ-cell tumors (GGCT, SGCT) include only germinoma and its synonyms dysgerminoma and seminoma.
- The nongerminomatous or nonseminomatous germ-cell tumors (NGGCT, NSGCT) include all other germ-cell tumors, pure and mixed.

The two classes reflect an important clinical difference. Compared with germinomatous tumors, nongerminomatous tumors tend to grow faster, have an earlier mean age at time of diagnosis (around 25 years versus 35 years, in the case of testicular cancers), and have a lower five-year survival rate. The survival rate for germinomatous tumors is higher in part because these tumors are very sensitive to radiation, and they also respond well to chemotherapy. The prognosis for nongerminomatous tumours has improved dramatically, however, due to the use of platinum-based chemotherapy regimens.

=== Germinomatous ===
Tumor	ICD-O	Peak Age (yr)	Benign or malignant	Histology	Tumor marker
Germinoma (including dysgerminoma and seminoma)		40–50	Malignant	Sheets of uniform polygonal cells with cleared cytoplasm; lymphocytes in the stroma	About 10% have elevated hCG
Dysgerminoma	M9060/3				
Seminoma	M9061/3				Placental alkaline phosphate (PLAP)

=== Nongerminomatous ===
Tumor	ICD-O	Peak Age (yr)	Benign or malignant	Histology	Tumor marker
Embryonal carcinoma	9070/3	20–30	Malignant	Poorly differentiated, pleomorphic cells in cords, sheets, or papillary formation	secrete hCG, AFP
Endodermal sinus tumor, also known as yolk sac tumor (EST, YST)	9071/3	3	Malignant	Poorly differentiated endothelium-like, cuboidal, or columnar cells	100% secrete AFP
Choriocarcinoma	9100/3	20–30	Malignant	Cytotrophoblast and syncytiotrophoblast without villus formation	100% secrete hCG
Teratoma including mature teratoma, dermoid cyst, immature teratoma, teratoma with malignant transformation	9080/0-9080/3	0–3, 15–30	Mature teratoma, dermoid cyst usually benign (but follow-up required); others usually malignant	Very variable, but "normal" tissues are common	Pure tumors do not secrete hCG, AFP
Polyembryoma	9072/3	15–25	?	?	?
Gonadoblastoma	9073/1	?	?	?	?

=== Mixed ===
Tumor	ICD-O	Peak Age (yr)	Benign or malignant	Histology	Tumor marker
Mixed		15–30	Malignant	Depends on elements present	Depends on elements present

Mixed germ cell tumors occur in many forms. Among these, a common form is teratoma with endodermal sinus tumor.

Teratocarcinoma refers to a germ cell tumor that is a mixture of teratoma with embryonal carcinoma, or with choriocarcinoma, or with both. This kind of mixed germ cell tumor may be known simply as a teratoma with elements of embryonal carcinoma or choriocarcinoma, or simply by ignoring the teratoma component and referring only to its malignant component: embryonal carcinoma and/or choriocarcinoma. They can present in the anterior mediastinum.

== Cause ==
Extragonadal GCTs were thought initially to be isolated metastases from an undetected primary tumor in a gonad, but many germ cell tumors are now known to be congenital and originate outside the gonads. The most notable of these is sacrococcygeal teratoma, the single most common tumor diagnosed in babies at birth.

Of all anterior mediastinal tumors, 15–20% are GCTs of which about 50% are benign teratomas. Ovarian teratomas may be associated with anti-NMDA receptor encephalitis.

== Location ==
GCTs most commonly arise in the testis, followed by the ovary and extragonadal sites. Extragonadal GCTs tend to arise in the midline, most commonly at the following sites:

- Central nervous system — in the pineal gland or sella turcica
- Head and neck — inside the mouth
- Mediastinum
- Retroperitoneum
- Spine, particularly sacrococcygeal teratoma

In females, GCTs account for 20-25% of ovarian tumors, but are predominantly benign mature teratomas. Malignant ovarian GCTs are comparatively rare, and consist of immature teratomas, dysgerminomas, yolk sac tumors, and mixed germ cell tumors.

In males, GCTs account of 95% of testicular tumors, and are all considered malignant. Seminoma is the most common diagnosis (50%), followed by mixed-germ cell tumor (40%), and other pure GCTs. In neonates, infants, and children younger than 4 years, most are sacrococcygeal teratomas.

Males with Klinefelter syndrome have a 50 times greater risk of GSTs. In these persons, GSTs usually contain nonseminomatous elements, present at an earlier age, and seldom are gonadal in location.

== Treatment ==
Treatment typically involves a combination of surgery and chemotherapy, depending on the subtype and location of the tumor. Surgery is performed upfront for testicular and ovarian tumors, as biopsies are associated with peritoneal and scrotal tumor seeding.

Benign GCTs such as mature teratomas (dermoid cysts) are cured by simple excision.

Testicular germ cell tumors are treated by orchiectomy, followed by surveillance, lymph node staging, and/or chemotherapy depending on the risk stratification defined by the International Germ Cell Cancer Collaborative Group (IGCCCG).

Treatment for ovarian germ cell tumors typically involves at least ovarian cystectomy. Removal of the ovaries, fallopian tube, uterus, and retroperitoneal lymph nodes may be planned depending on patient age, reproductive status, and extent of disease.

Patients with advanced or high-risk GCT may need to be treated with combination chemotherapy. The chemotherapy regimen most commonly used in GCTs is called PEB (or BEP), and consists of bleomycin, etoposide, and a platinum-based antineoplastic (cisplatin). Targeted treatments, such as immunotherapy, hormonal therapy and kinase inhibitors, are being evaluated for tumors that do not respond to chemotherapy.

== Prognosis ==
Germ cell tumors are a heterogeneous group with prognosis specific to their subtype and location, but cure rates exceed 80%. Advanced or metastatic germ cell tumors tend to be relatively responsive to chemotherapy compared to other types of cancer. Even for metastatic non-seminomatous germ cell tumors of the testis, 10-year median overall survival is 70-90%. In extragonadal GCTs, 5-year median overall survival ranges from 90% for extragonadal seminoma, to 17-70% for non-seminomatous tumors.

The 1997 International Germ Cell Consensus Classification is a prognostic tool for estimating the risk of relapse after treatment of germ-cell tumor.

Access to appropriate treatment has a large effect on outcome. A 1993 study of outcomes in Scotland found that for 454 men with nonseminomatous (nongerminomatous) GCTs diagnosed between 1975 and 1989, five-year survival increased over time and with earlier diagnosis. Adjusting for these and other factors, survival was 60% higher for men treated in a cancer unit that treated the majority of these men, though the unit treated more men with the worst prognosis.

== See also ==
- Embryonic stem cells
- Cancer research
