= Endodermal sinus tumor =

- Other names: Yolk sac tumor (YST)
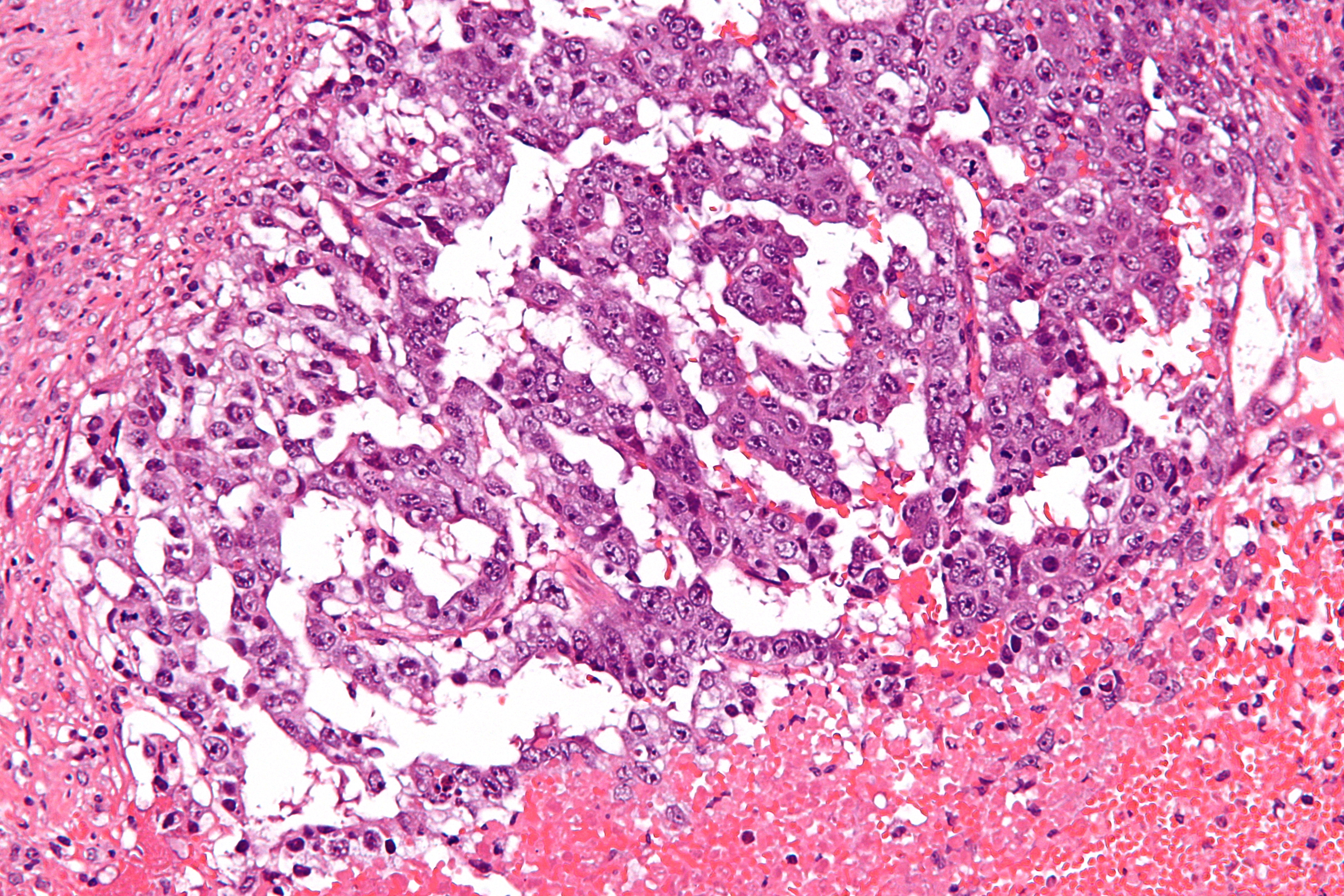
- Micrograph showing the yolk sac component of a mixed germ cell tumour. H&E stain.
- Specialty: Oncology

Endodermal sinus tumor (EST) is a member of the germ cell tumor group of cancers. It is the most common testicular tumor in children under three, and is also known as infantile embryonal carcinoma and yolk sac tumor. This age group has a very good prognosis. In contrast to the pure form typical of infants, adult endodermal sinus tumors are often found in combination with other kinds of germ cell tumor, particularly teratoma and embryonal carcinoma. While pure teratoma is usually benign, endodermal sinus tumor is malignant.

== Cause ==
Causes for this cancer are poorly understood.

== Diagnosis ==
The histology of EST is variable, but usually includes malignant endodermal cells. These cells secrete alpha-fetoprotein (AFP), which can be detected in tumor tissue, serum, cerebrospinal fluid, urine and, in the rare case of fetal EST, in amniotic fluid. When there is incongruence between biopsy and AFP test results for EST, the result indicating presence of EST dictates treatment. This is because EST often occurs as small "malignant foci" within a larger tumor, usually teratoma, and biopsy is a sampling method; biopsy of the tumor may reveal only teratoma, whereas elevated AFP reveals that EST is also present. GATA-4, a transcription factor, also may be useful in the diagnosis of EST.

Diagnosis of EST in pregnant women and in infants is complicated by the extremely high levels of AFP in those two groups. Tumor surveillance by monitoring AFP requires accurate correction for gestational age in pregnant women, and age in infants. In pregnant women, this can be achieved simply by testing maternal serum AFP rather than tumor marker AFP. In infants, the tumor marker test is used, but must be interpreted using a reference table or graph of normal AFP in infants.

=== Pathology ===
EST can have a multitude of morphologic patterns including: reticular, endodermal sinus-like, microcystic, papillary, solid, glandular, alveolar, polyvesicular vitelline, enteric and hepatoid.

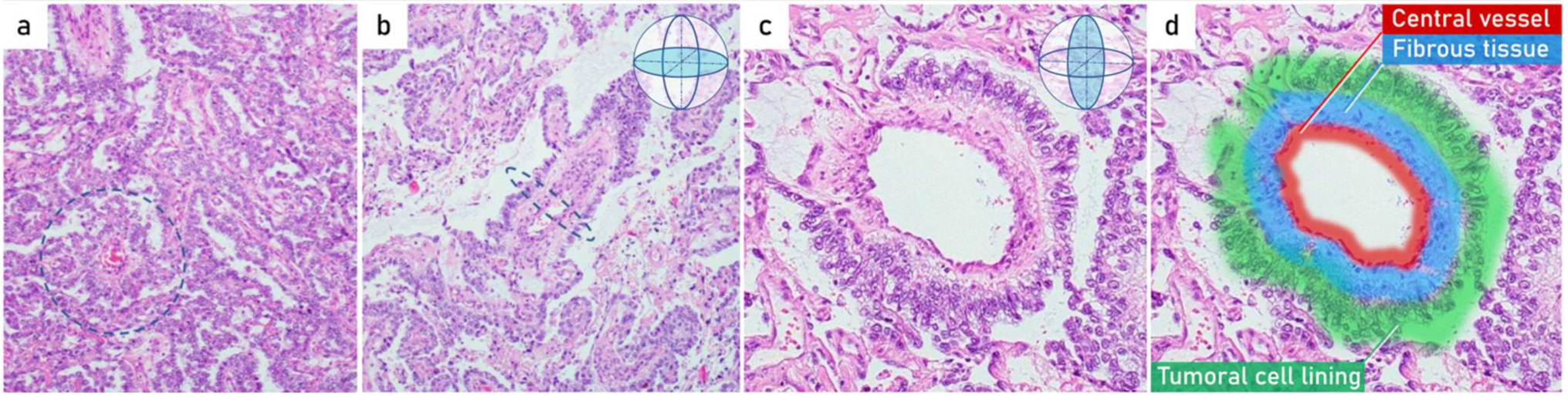
Histopathology of endodermal sinus tumor with Schiller–Duval bodies.
(a) papillary pattern combined with small tubopapillary endodermal sinus structure (Schiller–Duval body) in blue circle;
(b) marked tubulopapillary sinusoidal structure with central vascular core in longitudinal section (Schiller–Duval body);
(c,d) 400× g magnified image plus zoom of diagnostic round cystic Schiller–Duval body in a transverse section, with microcystic and papillary patterns around. The body has a central vessel surrounded by fibrous tissue, called the fibrovascular core, and it is surrounded by layers of the tumoral cells at the surface of that stalk. The structure is located in open cystic space also lined by tumoral cells. All those structures together are called a Schiller–Duval body and resemble primitive glomerulus. H&E stain.

Schiller–Duval bodies on histology are pathognomonic and seen in the context of the endodermal sinus-like pattern. Rarely, it can be found in the vagina.

== Treatment ==
Most treatments involve some combination of surgery and chemotherapy. Treatment with cisplatin, etoposide, and bleomycin has been described. Before modern chemotherapy, this type of neoplasm was highly lethal, but the prognosis has significantly improved since then. When endodermal sinus tumors are treated promptly with surgery and chemotherapy, fatal outcomes are exceedingly rare.

== See also ==
- Germ cell tumor
- Testicular cancer
