= PRSS55 =

Protein-coding gene in the species Homo sapiens

Identifiers
- Aliases: PRSS55, CT153, T-SP1, TSP1, UNQ9391, protease, serine 55, serine protease 55
- External IDs: OMIM: 615144; MGI: 1918287; GeneCards: PRSS55

Gene location (Human)
Chr.	Chromosome 8 (human)
Band	8p23.1	Start	10,525,532 bp
Band	8p23.1	End	10,554,166 bp

Gene location (Mouse)
Chr.	Chromosome 14 (mouse)
Band	14|14 D1	Start	64,075,438 bp
Band	14|14 D1	End	64,090,162 bp
RNA expression pattern
Bgee	Human / Mouse (ortholog); Top expressed in: gonad; right testis; left testis; cerebellar cortex; cerebellar hemisphere; right hemisphere of cerebellum; primary visual cortex; amygdala; Brodmann area 9; C1 segment / Top expressed in: seminiferous tubule; spermatid; spermatocyte; gastrula; lacrimal gland; embryo; quadriceps femoris muscle; free upper limb; intercostal muscle; major salivary gland; More reference expression data
BioGPS	n/a
Gene ontology
Molecular function	peptidase activity; serine-type peptidase activity; hydrolase activity; serine-type endopeptidase activity
Cellular component	cytoplasm; integral component of membrane; cytosol; membrane
Biological process	proteolysis
Sources:Amigo / QuickGO
Orthologs
Databases	NCBI: entry; OMA: entry
Species	Human	Mouse
Entrez	203074	71037
Ensembl	ENSG00000184647; ENSG00000285141	ENSMUSG00000034623
UniProt	Q6UWB4	Q14BX2
RefSeq (mRNA)	NM_001197020; NM_198464	NM_001081063
RefSeq (protein)	NP_001183949; NP_940866	NP_001074532; NP_001366451; NP_001366452
Location (UCSC)	Chr 8: 10.53 – 10.55 Mb	Chr 14: 64.08 – 64.09 Mb
PubMed search
- Wikidata
View/Edit Human	View/Edit Mouse

Serine protease 55 is a protein that in humans is encoded by the PRSS55 gene.

== Function ==
This gene encodes a member of a group of membrane-anchored chymotrypsin (S1)-like serine proteases. The encoded protein is primarily expressed in the Leydig and Sertoli cells of the testis and may be involved in male fertility. Alternate splicing results in multiple transcript variants. [provided by RefSeq, Sep 2010].
