= Leydig cell tumour =

- Other names: Testicular interstitial cell tumour
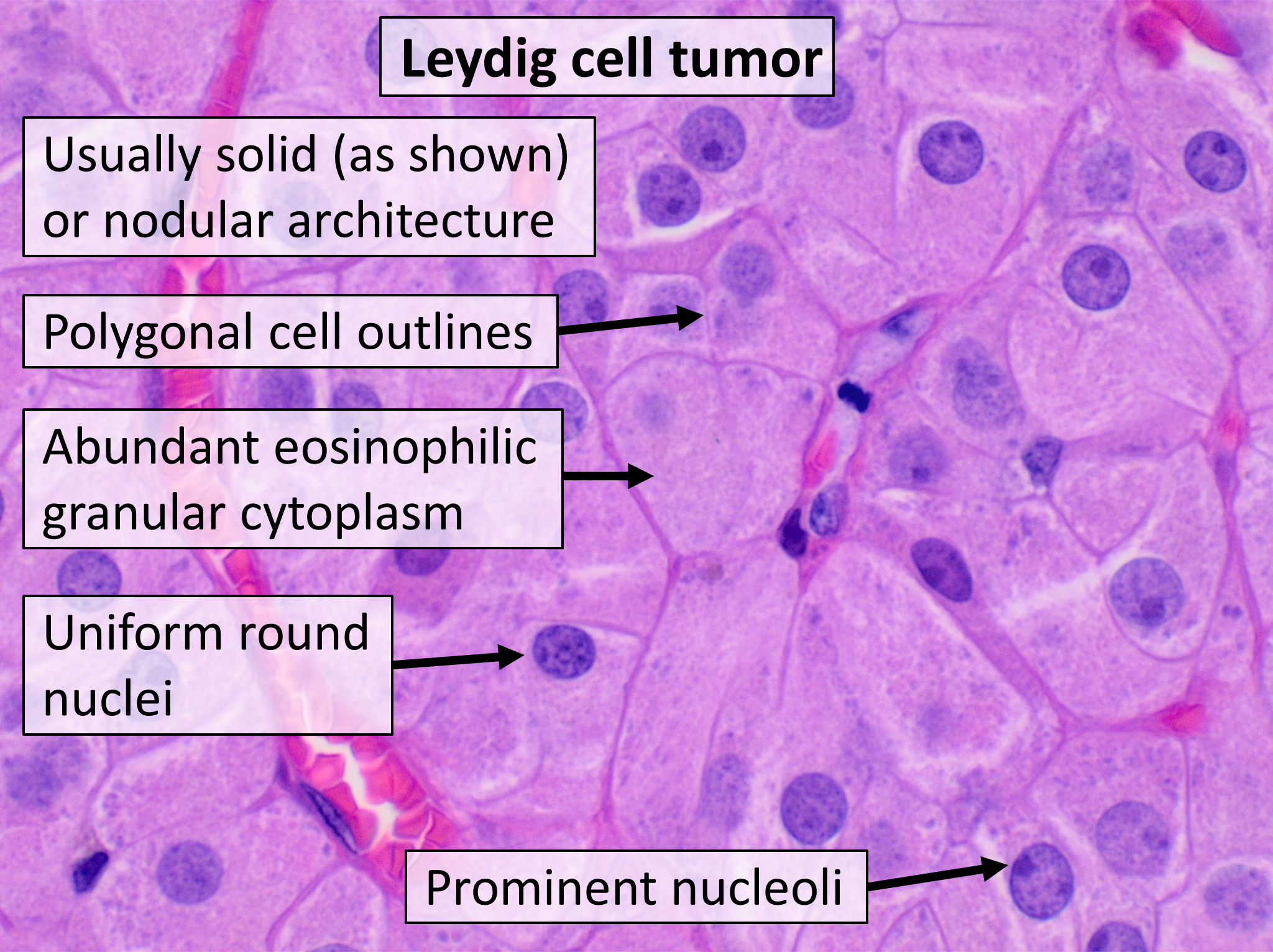
- Histopathology of a Leydig cell tumor, high magnification, H&E stain, showing typical features.
- Specialty: Oncology, endocrinology

Leydig cell tumour, also Leydig cell tumor (US spelling), (testicular) interstitial cell tumour and (testicular) interstitial cell tumor (US spelling), is a member of the sex cord-stromal tumour group of ovarian and testicular cancers. It arises from Leydig cells. While the tumour can occur at any age, it occurs most often in young adults. However, in women it tends to happen after menopapuse.

A Sertoli–Leydig cell tumour is a combination of a Leydig cell tumour and a Sertoli cell tumour from Sertoli cells.

== Presentation ==
The majority of Leydig cell tumors are found in males, usually at 5–10 years of age or in middle adulthood (30–60 years). Children typically present with precocious puberty.

In men, testicular swelling is the most common presenting feature. Other symptoms depend on age and the type of tumour. If it is secreting androgens the tumour is usually asymptomatic, but can cause precocious puberty in pre-pubertal boys. If the tumour secretes oestrogens it can cause feminisation in young boys. In adults, this causes a number of problems including gynaecomastia, erectile dysfunction, infertility, feminine hair distribution, gonadogenital atrophy, and a loss of libido.

In women it tends to happen after menopause, but premenopausal cases have been reported. Sertoli–Leydig cell tumours of women tend to happen earlier, in the second or the third decade of a woman's life. Due to excess testosterone secreted by the tumour, one-third of female patients present with a recent history of progressive masculinization. Masculinization is preceded by anovulation, oligomenorrhea, amenorrhea and defeminization. Additional signs include acne and hirsutism, voice deepening, clitoromegaly, temporal hair recession, and an increase in musculature. Serum testosterone level is high.

== Cause ==
Animal studies a suggest possible link with C8 (C_{8}HF_{15}O_{2}, perfluorooctanoic acid).

== Diagnosis ==
Presence of an ovarian tumour plus hormonal disturbances suggests a Leydig cell tumour, granulosa cell tumour or thecoma. However, hormonal disturbances, in Leydig tumours, is present in only 2/3 of cases. Testicular Leydig cell tumours can be detected sonographically, ultrasound examinations may be ordered in the event of a palpable scrotal lump, however incidental identification of these lesions is also possible.

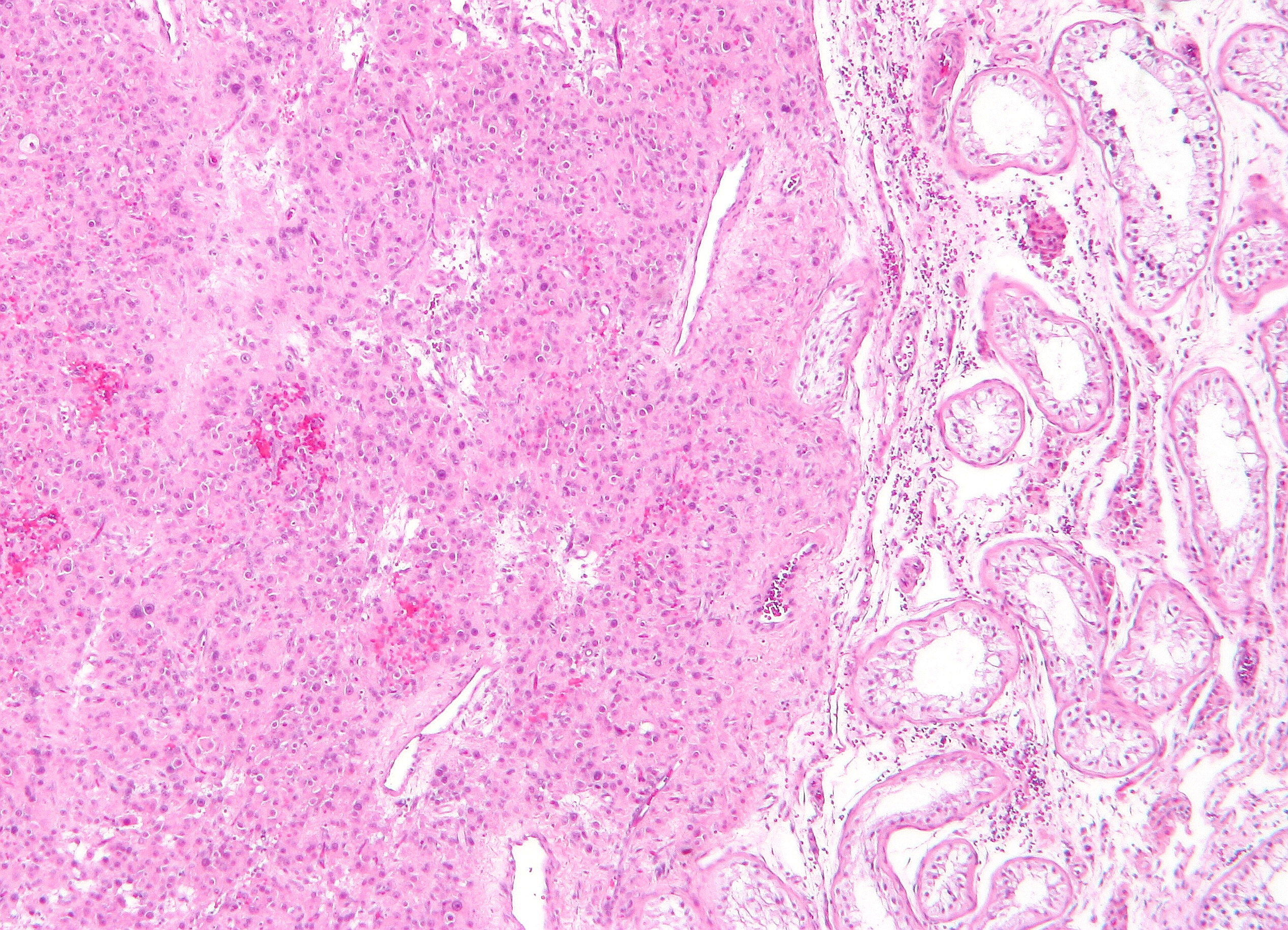
Low magnification micrograph of a Leydig cell tumour. H&E stain.

A conclusive diagnosis is made via histology, as part of a pathology report made during or after surgery. Reinke crystals are classically found in these tumours and help confirm the diagnosis, although they are seen in less than half of all Leydig cell tumours. Immunohistochemical markers of Leydig cell tumours include inhibin-alpha, calretinin, and melan-A.

== Treatment ==
The usual chemotherapy regimen has limited efficacy in tumours of this type, although imatinib has shown some promise. There is no current role for radiotherapy.

The usual treatment is surgery. The surgery for females usually is a fertility-sparing unilateral salpingo-oophorectomy. For malignant tumours, the surgery may be radical and usually is followed by adjuvant chemotherapy, sometimes by radiation therapy. In all cases, initial treatment is followed by surveillance. Because in many cases Leydig cell tumour does not produce elevated tumour markers, the focus of surveillance is on repeated physical examination and imaging.

In males, a radical inguinal orchiectomy is typically performed. However, testes-sparing surgery can be used to maintain fertility in children and young adults. This approach involves an inguinal or scrotal incision and ultrasound guidance if the tumour is non-palpable. This can be done because the tumour is typically unifocal, not associated with precancerous lesions, and is unlikely to recur.

The prognosis is generally good as the tumour tends to grow slowly and usually is benign: 10% are malignant. For malignant tumours with undifferentiated histology, prognosis is poor.

== Additional images ==
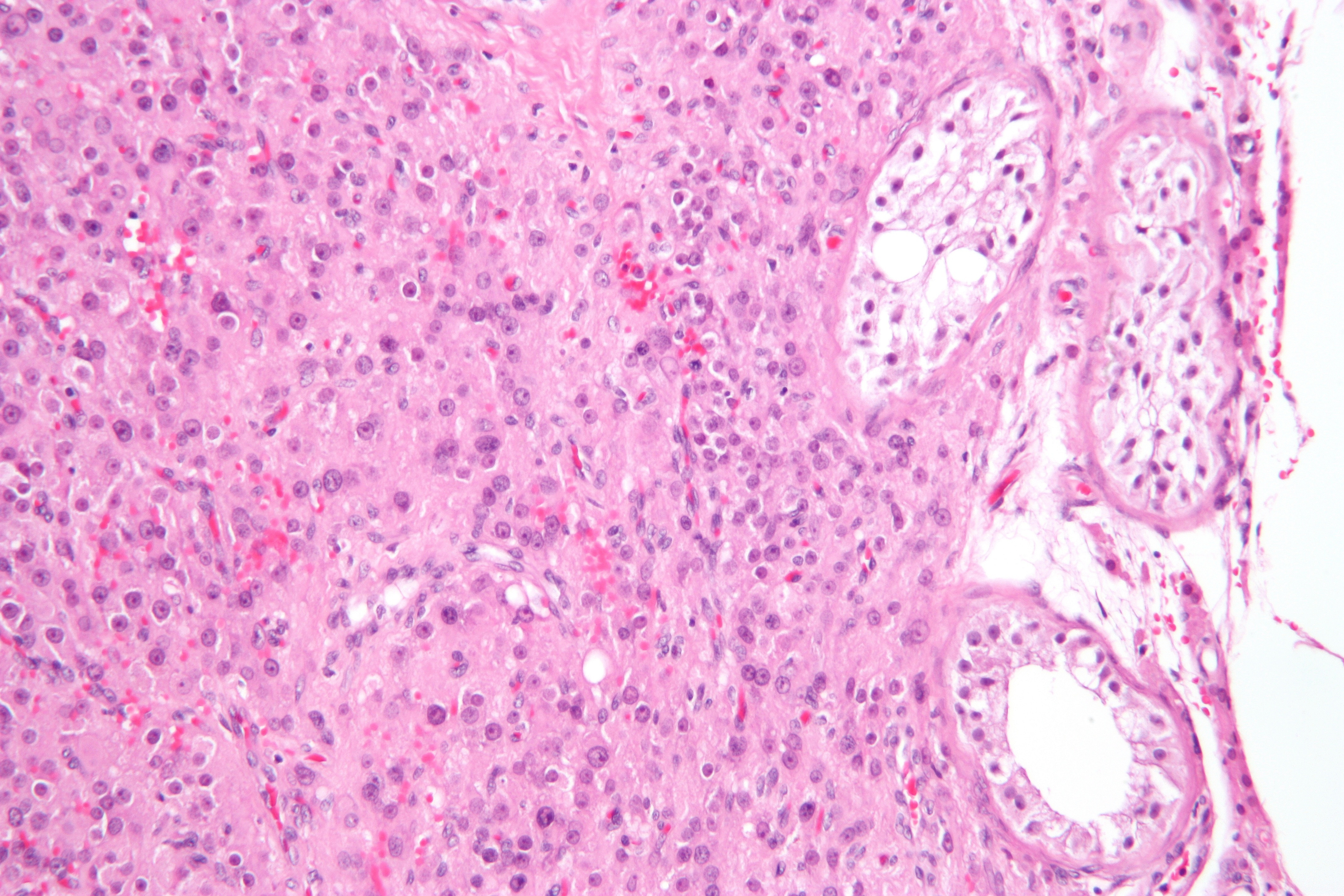
Intermediate magnification micrograph of a Leydig cell tumour. H&E stain.

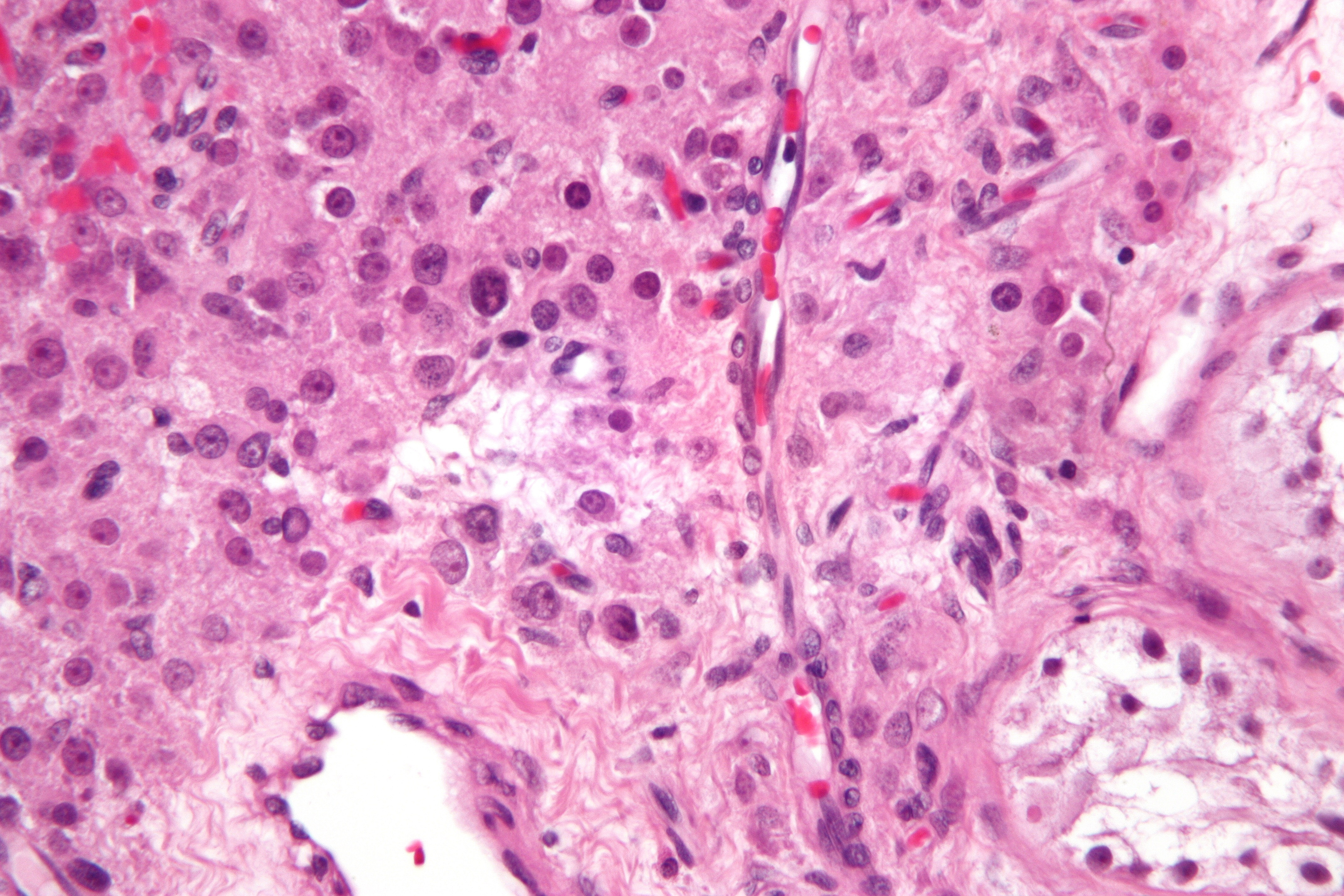
High magnification micrograph of a Leydig cell tumour. H&E stain.

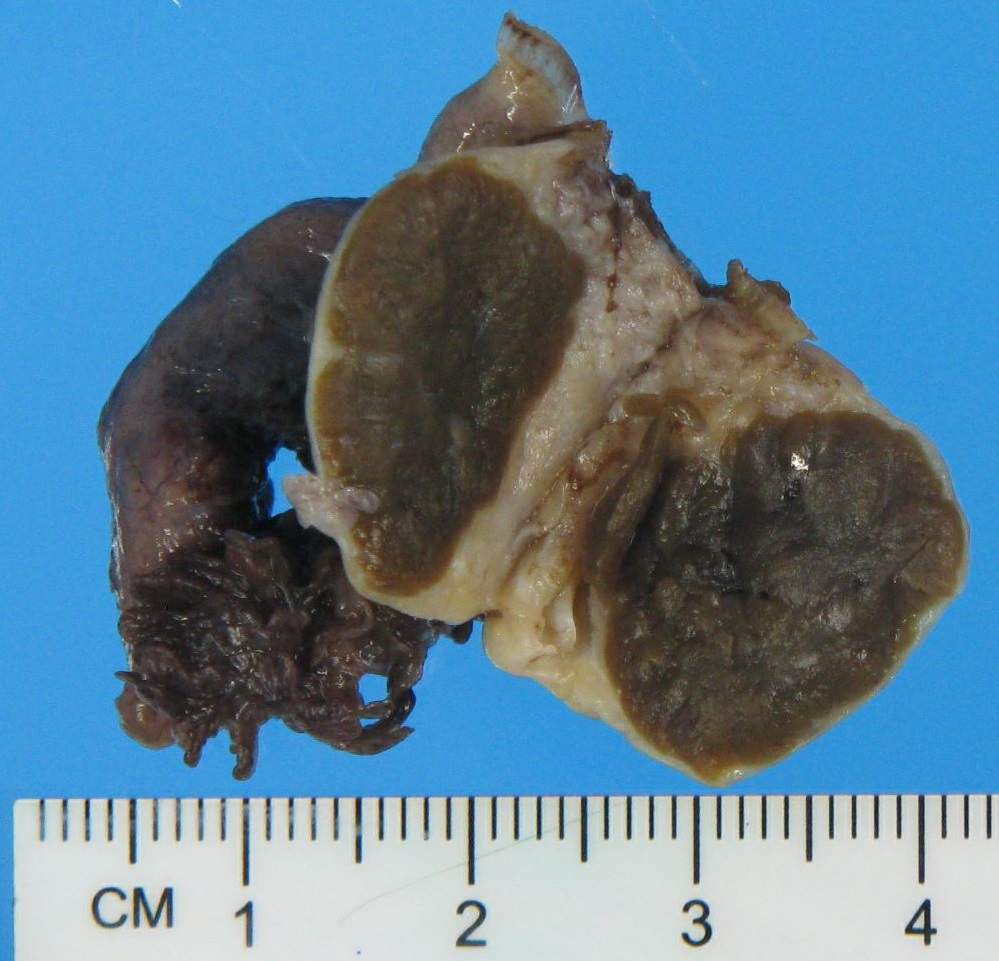
Typical gross pathology of a Leydig cell tumor (in this case of the ovary): A well circumscribed, solid homogeneous mass with golden brown to brownish green cut surface.

== See also ==
- Androgen-dependent syndromes
- Sertoli cell tumour
- Sertoli–Leydig cell tumour
