= Sex cord–gonadal stromal tumour =

Group of tumors derived from ovarian and testicular stromal cells

- Other names: Sex cord–stromal tumour
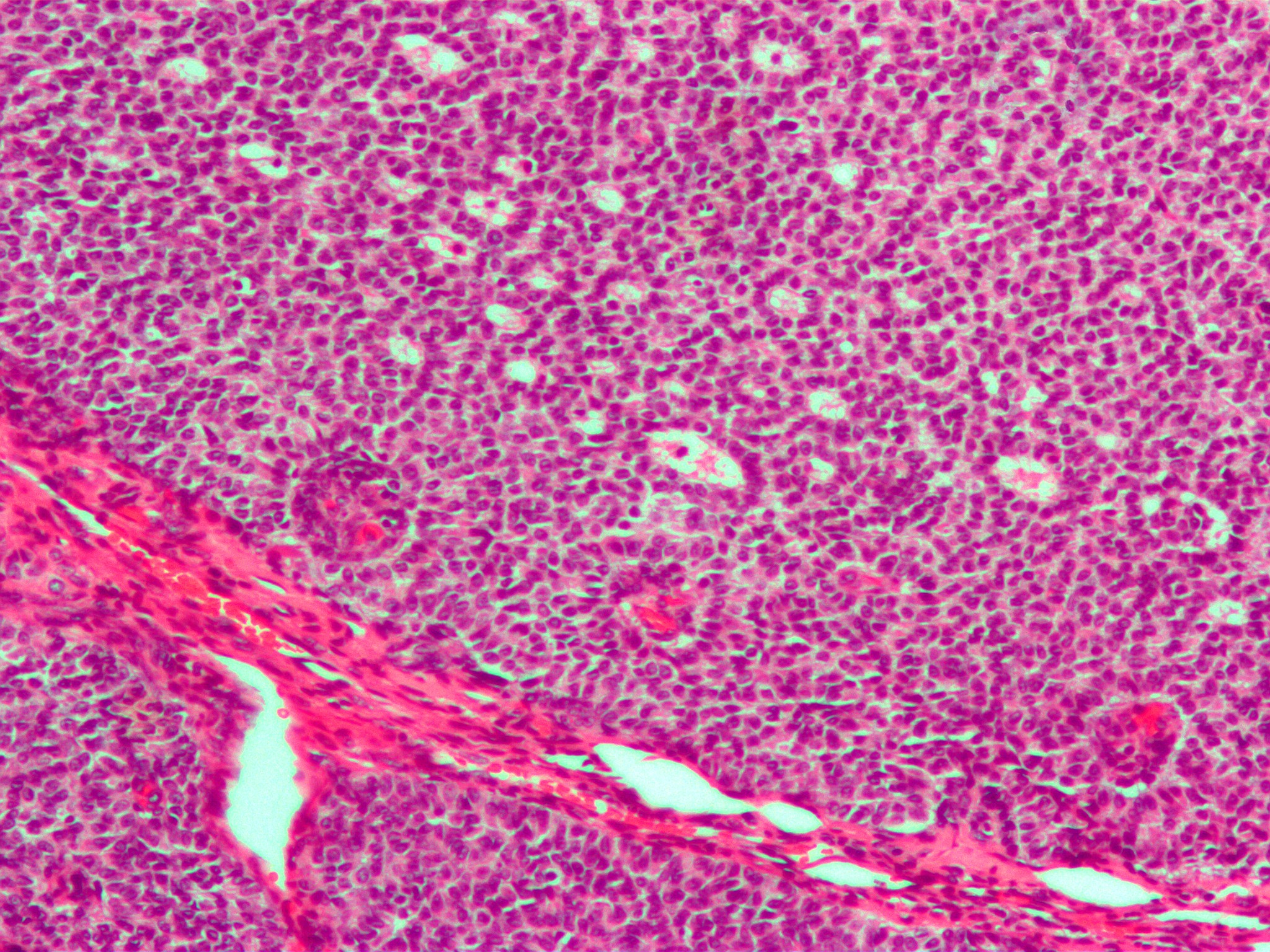
- Micrograph of a granulosa cell tumour, a type of sex-cord–gonadal stromal tumour. H&E stain.
- Specialty: Oncology, gynecology

Sex cord–gonadal stromal tumour is a group of tumours derived from the stromal component of the ovary and testis, which comprises the granulosa, thecal cells and fibrocytes. In contrast, the epithelial cells originate from the outer epithelial lining surrounding the gonad while the germ cell tumors arise from the precursor cells of the gametes, hence the name germ cell. In humans, this group accounts for 8% of ovarian cancers and under 5% of testicular cancers. Their diagnosis is histological: only a biopsy of the tumour can make an exact diagnosis. They are often suspected of being malignant prior to operation, being solid ovarian tumours that tend to occur most commonly in post menopausal women.

This group of tumours is significantly less common than testicular germ cell tumours in men, and slightly less common than ovarian germ cell tumours in women (see Ovarian cancer).

== Types ==
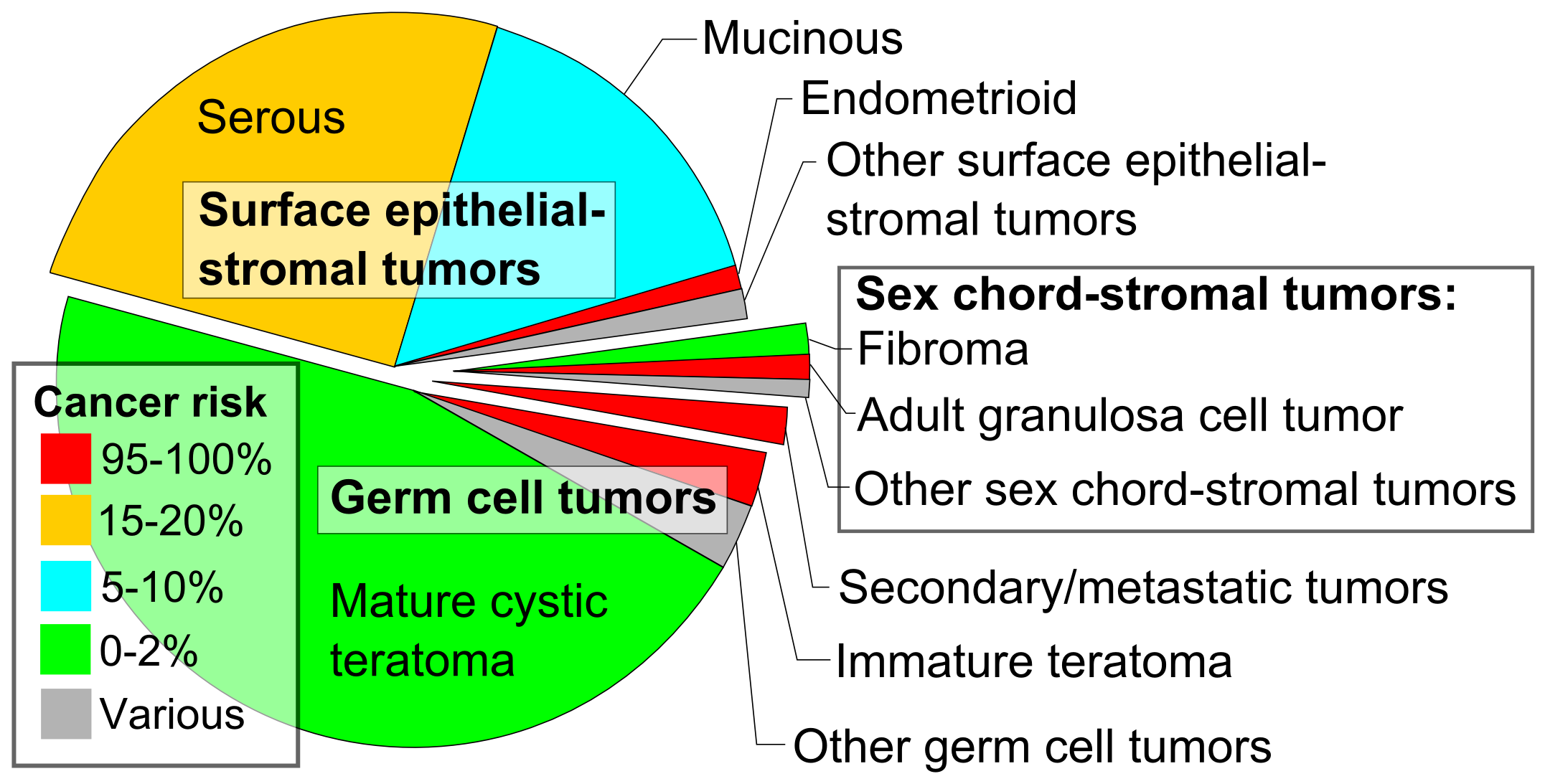
Ovarian tumours by incidence and risk of ovarian cancer, with sex cord-stromal tumours at right.

Classification of sex cord–gonadal stromal tumours by their histology
| | | Cell/tissue normal location | | |
| | | Ovary (female) | Testicle (male) | Mixed |
|---|---|---|---|---|
| Cell/tissue type | Sex cord | Granulosa cell tumour | Sertoli cell tumour | Gynandroblastoma |
| Cell/tissue type | Gonadal stroma | Thecoma, Fibroma | Leydig cell tumour | Gynandroblastoma |
| Cell/tissue type | Mixed | Sertoli–Leydig cell tumour | | Gynandroblastoma |

=== Tumour types in order of prevalence ===
- Granulosa cell tumour. This tumour arises from granulosa cells, which are normally are found in the ovary. It is malignant in 20% of women diagnosed with it. It tends to present in women in the 50-55yo age group with post menopausal vaginal bleeding. Uncommonly, a similar but possibly distinct tumour, juvenile granulosa cell tumour, presents in pre-pubertal girls with precocious puberty. In both groups, the vaginal bleeding is due to oestrogen secreted by the tumour. In older women, treatment is total abdominal hysterectomy and removal of both ovaries. In young girls, fertility sparing treatment is the mainstay for non-metastatic disease.
- Sertoli cell tumour. This tumour produces Sertoli cells, which normally are found in the testicle. This tumour occurs in both men and women.
- Thecoma. This tumour produces theca of follicle, a tissue normally found in the ovarian follicle. The tumour is almost exclusively benign and unilateral. It typically secretes estrogen, and as a result women with this tumour often present with postmenopausal bleeding.
- Leydig cell tumour. This tumour produces Leydig cells, which normally are found in the testicle and tend to secrete androgens.
- Sertoli–Leydig cell tumour. This tumour produces both Sertoli and Leydig cells. Although both cell types normally occur in the testicle, this tumour can occur in the ovary.
- Gynandroblastoma. A very rare tumour producing both ovarian (granulosa and/or theca) and testicular (Sertoli and/or Leydig) cells or tissues. Typically it consists of adult-type granulosa cells and Sertoli cells, but it has been reported with juvenile-type granulosa cells. It has been reported to occur in the ovary usually, rarely in the testis. Due to its rarity, the malignant potential of this tumour is unclear; there is one case report of late metastasis.
- Sex cord tumour with annular tubules, abbreviated SCTAT. These are rare tumours that may be sporadic or associated with Peutz–Jeghers syndrome.

== Diagnosis ==
Definitive diagnosis of these tumours is based on the histology of tissue obtained in a biopsy or surgical resection. In a retrospective study of 72 cases in children and adolescents, the histology was important to prognosis.

A number of molecules have been proposed as markers for this group of tumours. CD56 may be useful for distinguishing sex cord–stromal tumours from some other types of tumours, although it does not distinguish them from neuroendocrine tumours. Calretinin has also been suggested as a marker. For diagnosis of granulosa cell tumour, inhibin is under investigation. Granulosa cell tumours and Sertoli-Leydig cell tumours have specific genetic mutations that are characteristic and can help support the diagnosis.

On magnetic resonance imaging, a fibroma may produce one of several imaging features that might be used in the future to identify this rare tumour prior to surgery.

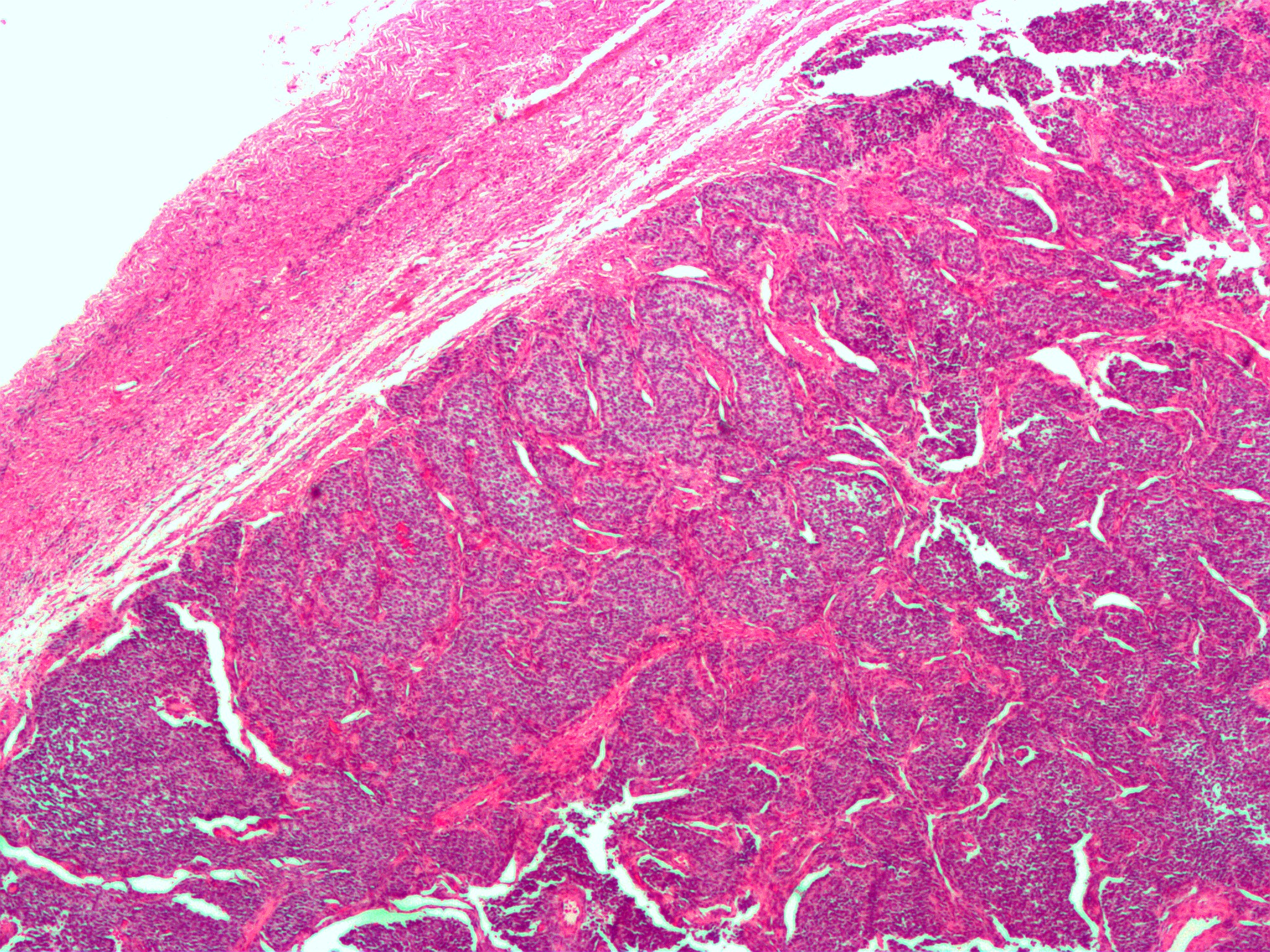
Low magnification micrograph of a granulosa cell tumour. H&E stain.

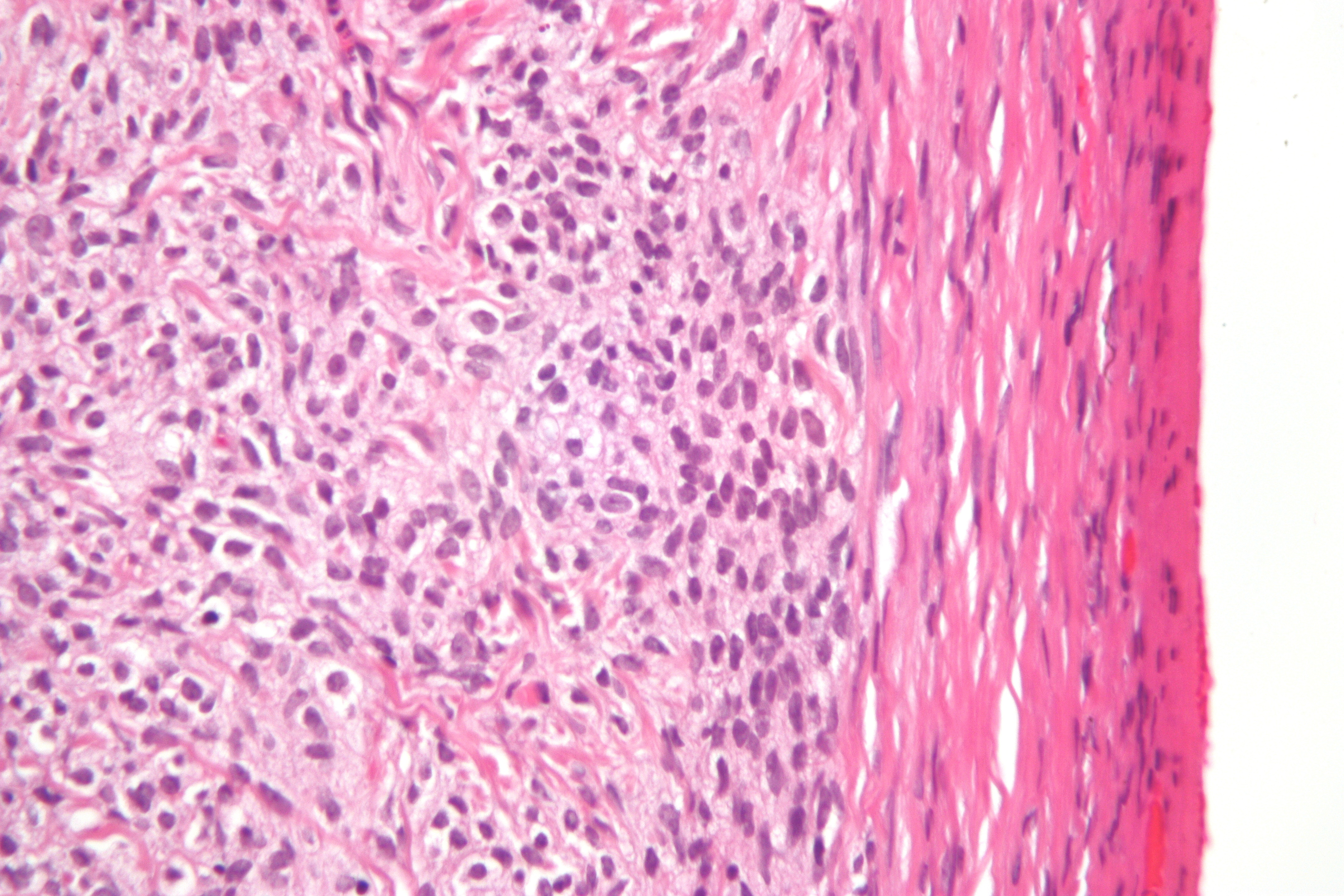
High magnification micrograph of a thecoma. H&E stain.

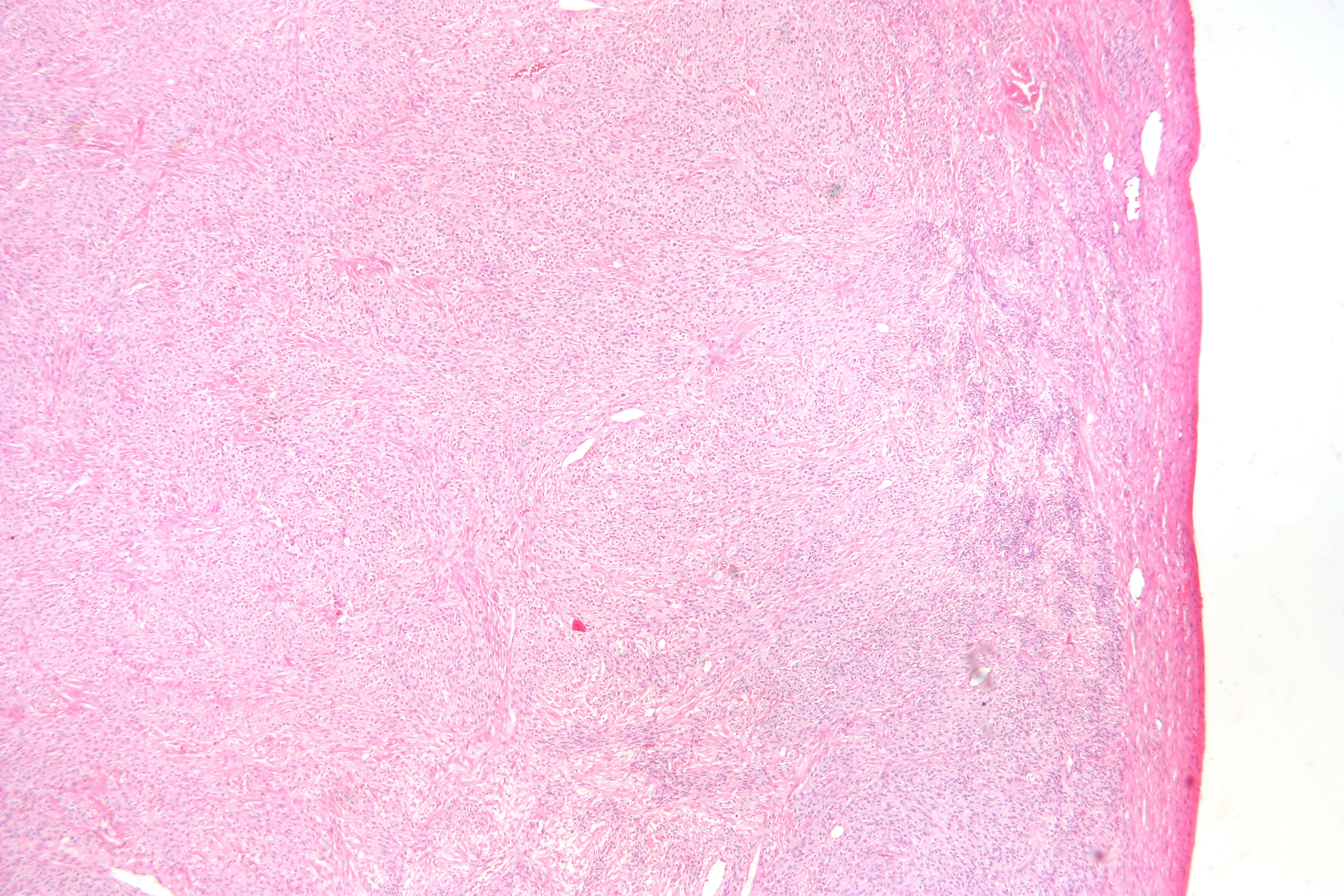
Low magnification micrograph of a thecoma. H&E stain.

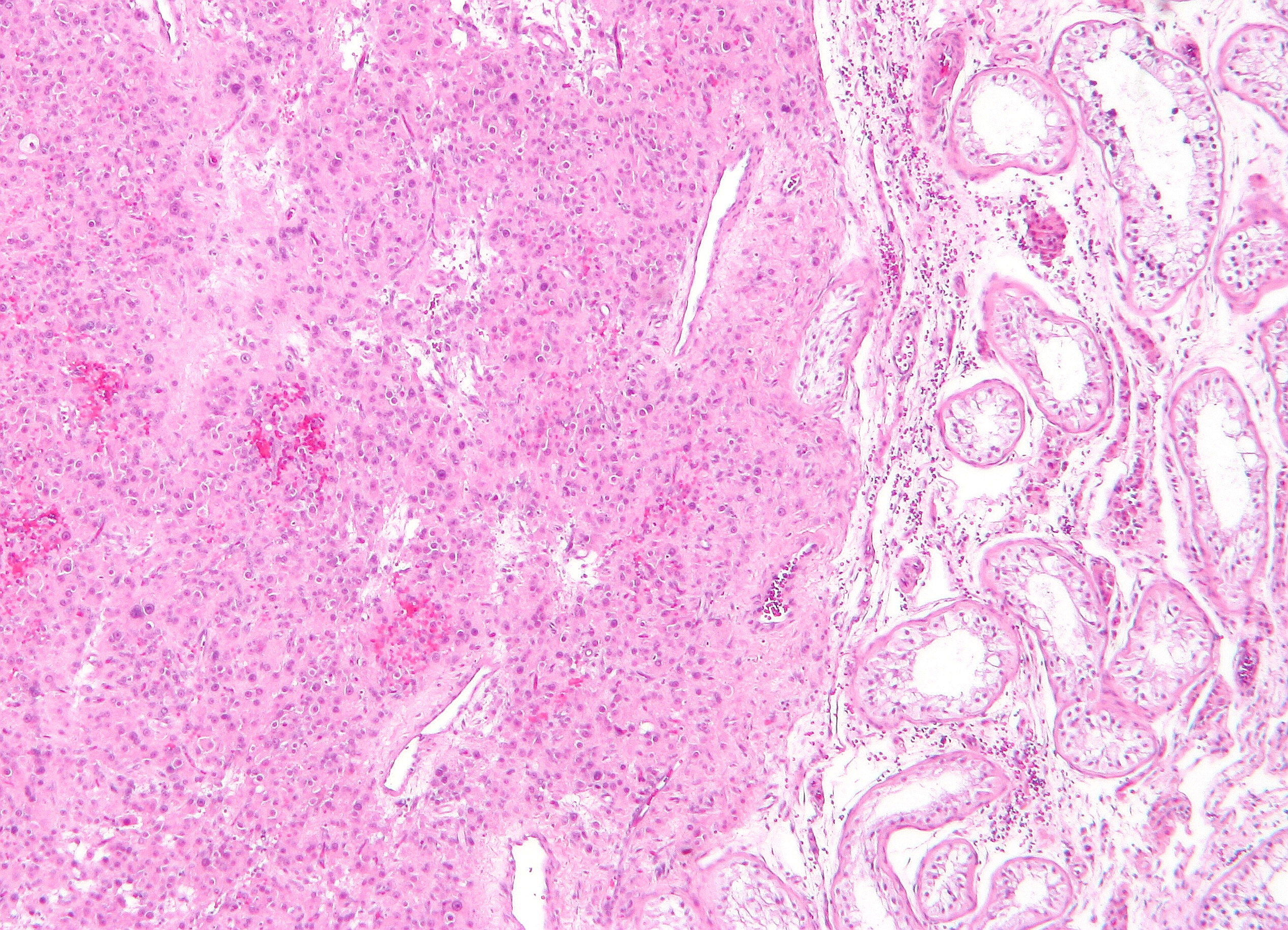
Low magnification micrograph of a Leydig cell tumour. H&E stain.

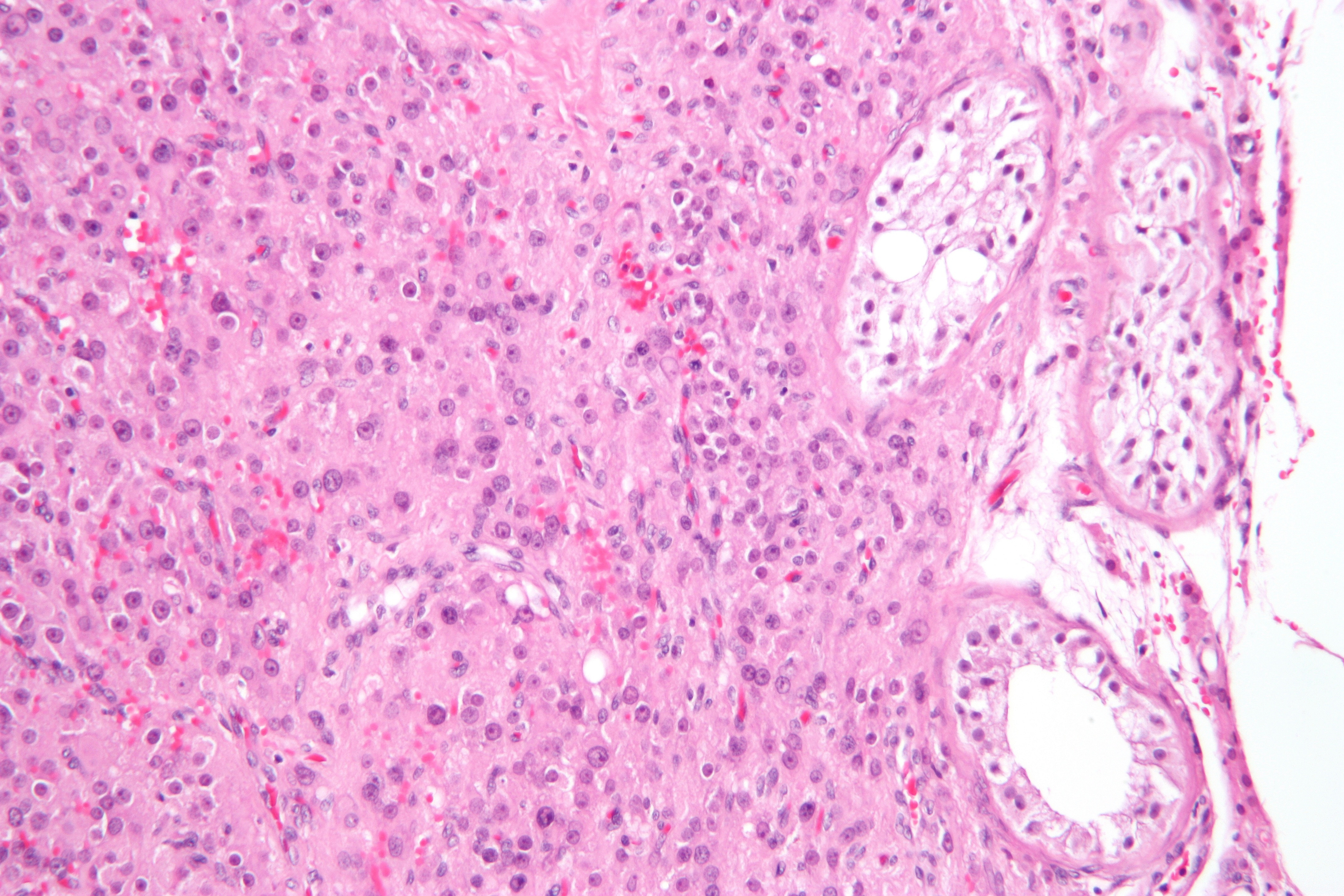
Intermediate magnification micrograph of a Leydig cell tumour. H&E stain.

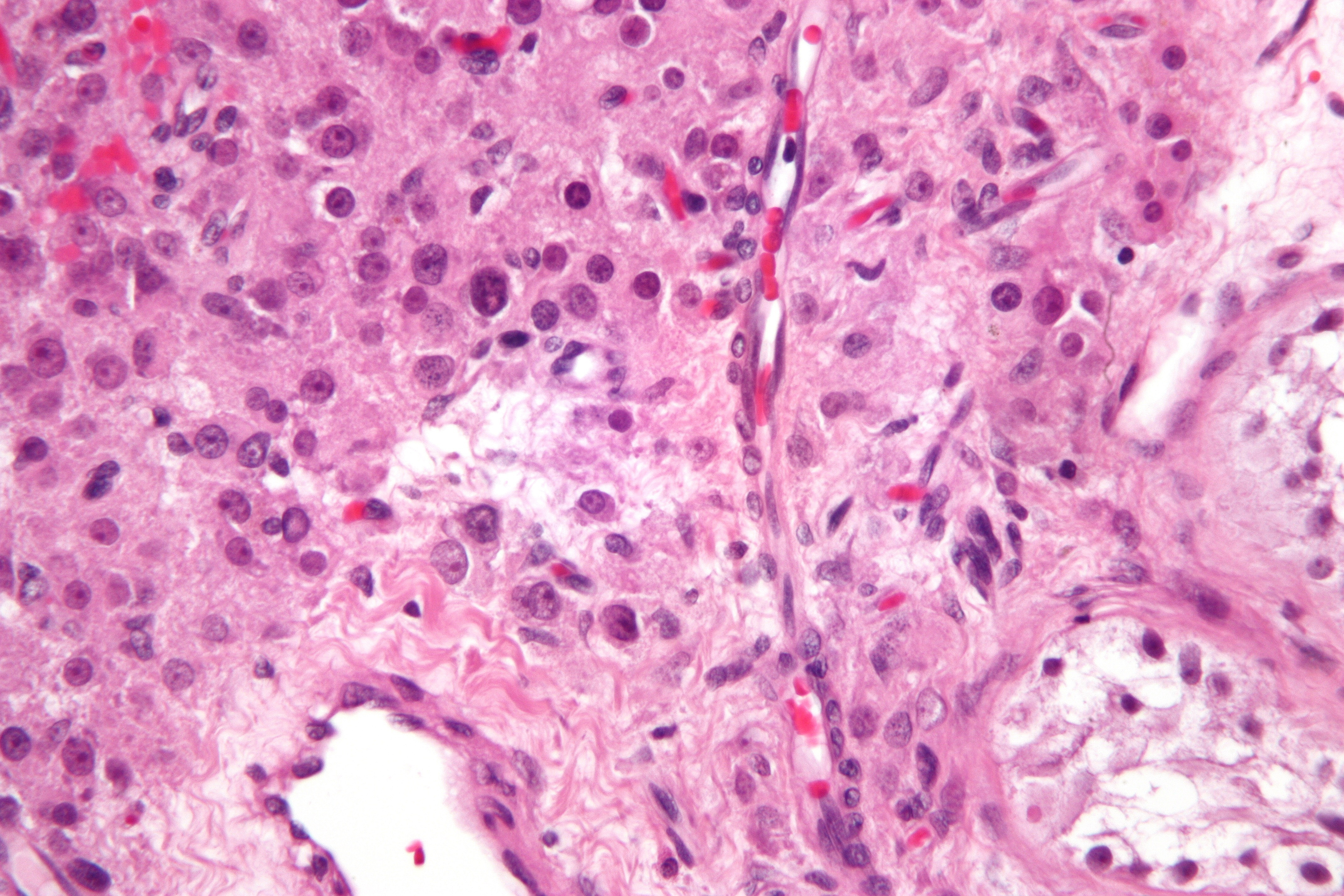
High magnification micrograph of a Leydig cell tumour. H&E stain.

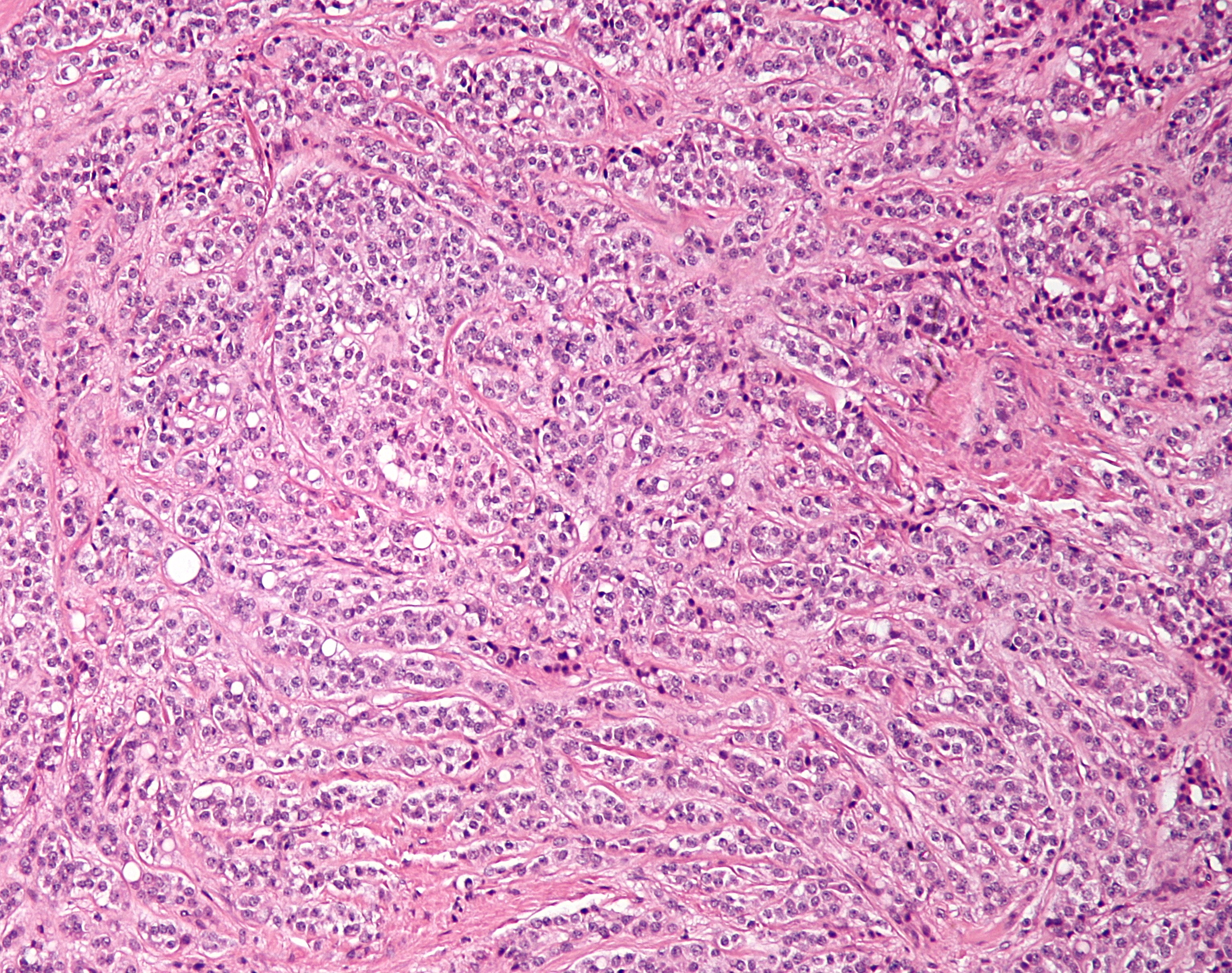
Low magnification micrograph of a Sertoli cell tumour. H&E stain.

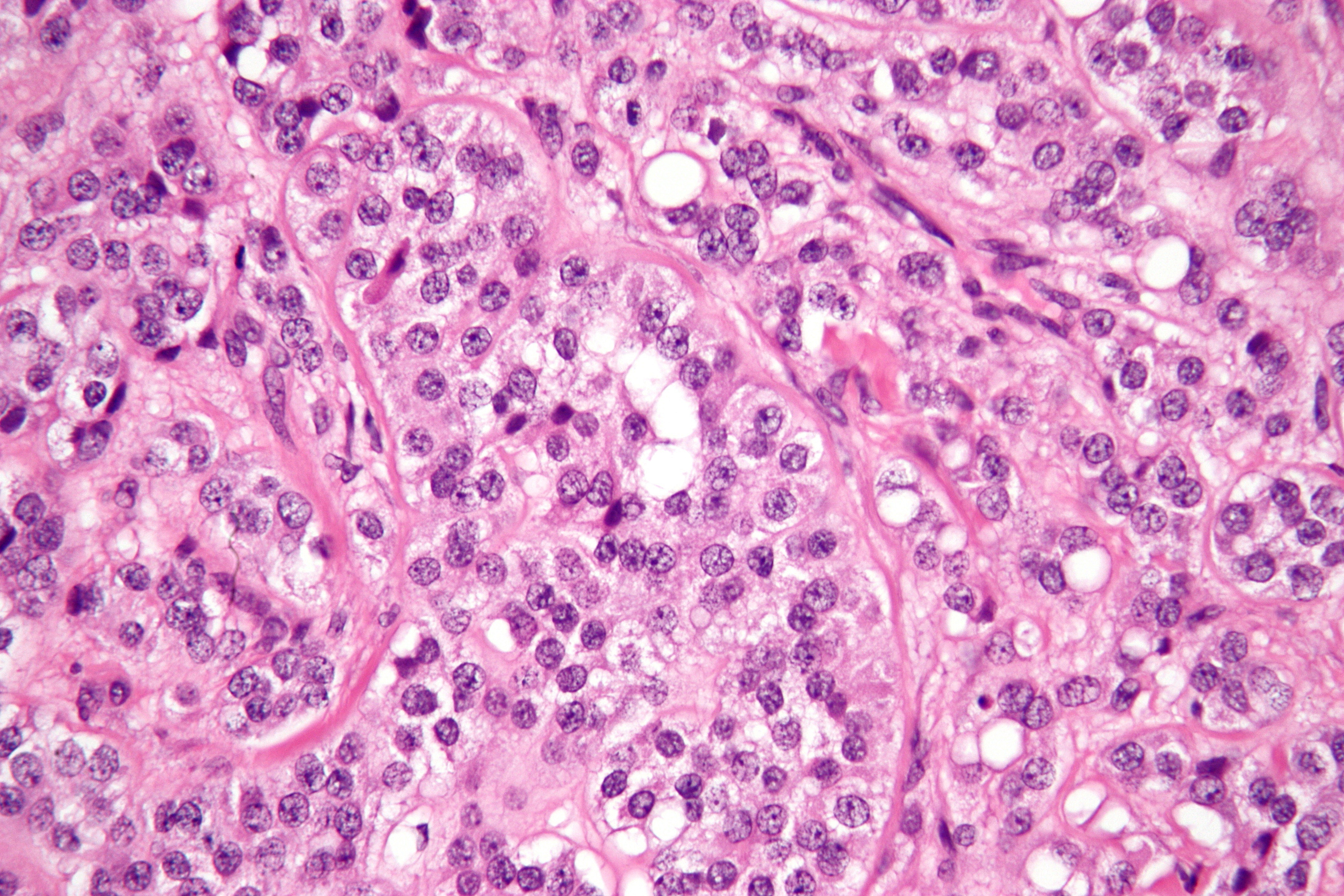
High magnification micrograph of a Sertoli cell tumour. H&E stain.

== Prognosis ==
A retrospective study of 83 women with sex cord–stromal tumours (73 with granulosa cell tumour and 10 with Sertoli-Leydig cell tumour), all diagnosed between 1975 and 2003, reported that survival was higher with age under 50, smaller tumour size, and absence of residual disease. The study found no effect of chemotherapy. A retrospective study of 67 children and adolescents reported some benefit of cisplatin-based chemotherapy.

== Research ==
A prospective study of ovarian sex cord–stromal tumours in children and adolescents began enrolling participants in 2005. The International Ovarian and Testicular Stromal Tumor Registry is studying these rare tumours and collecting data on them to further research. Targeted treatments are being evaluated for these tumours as well.

== See also ==
- Sex cord
- Stroma of ovary
