= Reinke crystals =

Feature of Leydig cells of the testes

Reinke crystals are rod-like cytoplasmic inclusions which can be found in Leydig cells of the testes. Occurring only in adult humans and wild bush rats, their function is unknown.

== Role in Ovarian Cancer ==
Ovarian stromal tumors having a predominant pattern of fibroma or thecoma but also containing cells typical of steroid hormone-secreting cells were reported. Some of the tumors were classified as luteinized thecomas because the steroid cells resembled lutein cells and lacked crystalloids of Reinke. Others were classified as stromal Leydig cell tumors as seen in tumors of the testes because Reinke crystalloids were identified in the steroid cells. The stromal Leydig tumors occurred at an average age of 61 years and were associated with ovarian hyperandrogenism which led to virilization in some cases, endometrial hyperplasia in other cases, and endometrial hyperplasia with carcinoma in the rest of the cases. Luteinized thecomas and stromal Leydig cell tumors are indistinguishable except for the presence of crystalloids of Reinke in the latter. In view of the prolonged search that is necessary to find these structures in some stromal Leydig cell tumors and their well-known absence in the majority of testicular Leydig cell tumors, it is reasonable to assume that an unknown proportion of tumors in the luteinized thecoma category are unrecognized stromal Leydig cell tumors.

Another ovarian tumor where Reinke crystalloids were noted is the Brenner tumour, an epithelial-stromal ovarian tumor distinguishable by nests of transitional epithelial cells (urothelial) with longitudinal nuclear grooves (coffee bean nuclei) in abundant fibrous stroma.

Also recall that the "coffee bean nuclei" are the nuclear grooves exceptionally pathognomonic to the sex cord stromal tumor, the ovarian granulosa cell tumor, with the fluid-filled spaces Call–Exner bodies between the granulosa cells.

They are large enough to be seen in an optical microscope and can be visualized using Giemsa, trichrome, Gram, and PAS stains. Reinke crystals are rare in normal testes, but are found in approximately one third of all Leydig cell tumours.

== Etymology ==
These crystals are named after the German anatomist Friedrich Berthold Reinke.
