= Sertoli cell tumour =

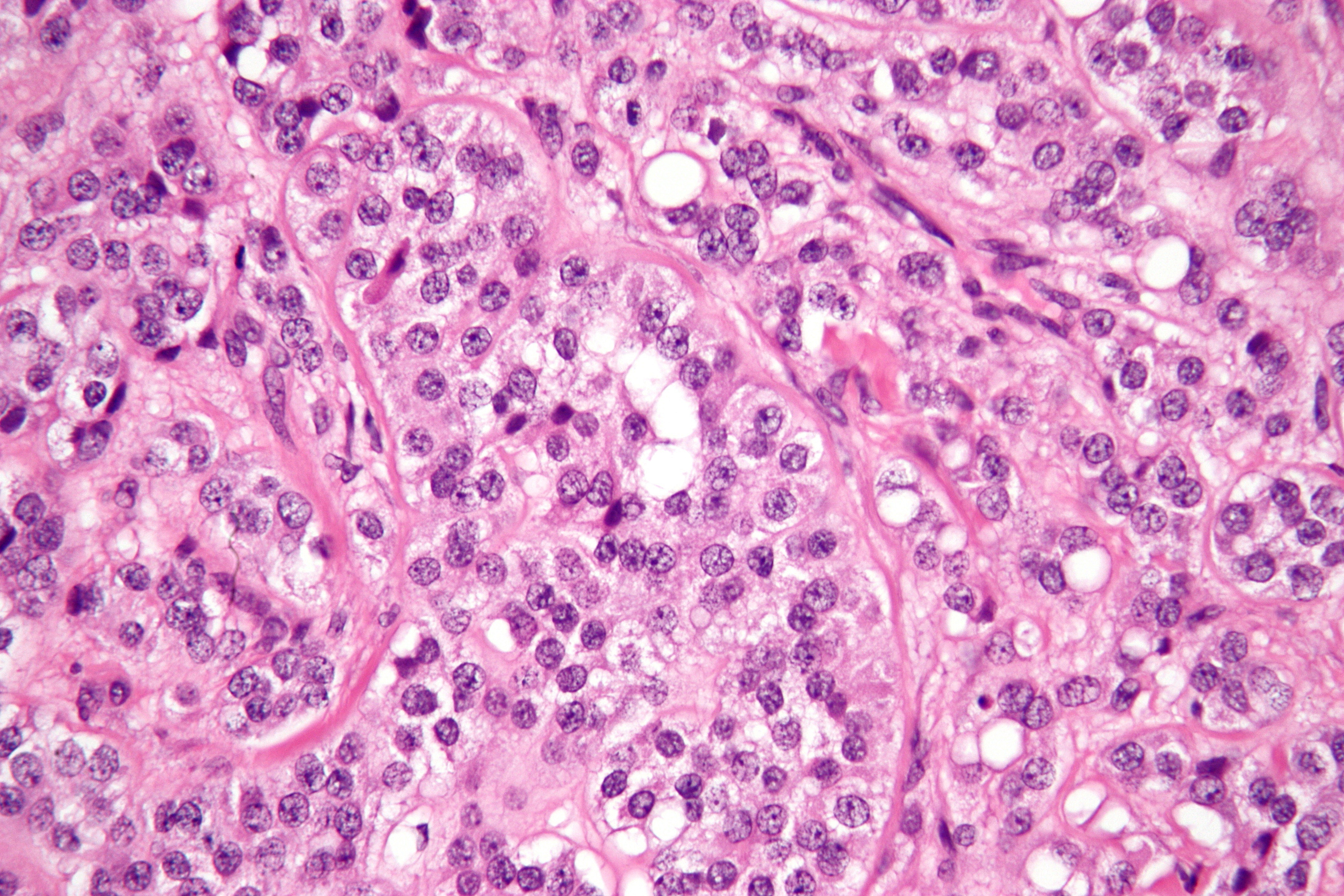
- Micrograph of a Sertoli cell tumour. H&E stain.
- Specialty: Oncology

A Sertoli cell tumour, also Sertoli cell tumor (US spelling), is a sex cord–gonadal stromal tumour of Sertoli cells. They can occur in the testis or ovary. They are very rare and generally peak between the ages of 35 and 50. They are typically well-differentiated and may be misdiagnosed as seminomas as they often appear very similar.

A tumor that produces both Sertoli cells and Leydig cells is known as a Sertoli–Leydig cell tumor.

== Presentation ==
In males, Sertoli cell tumours typically present as a testicular mass or firmness, and their presence may be accompanied by gynaecomastia (25%) if they produce oestrogens, or precocious pseudopuberty in young boys, especially if they produce androgens.

== Diagnosis ==
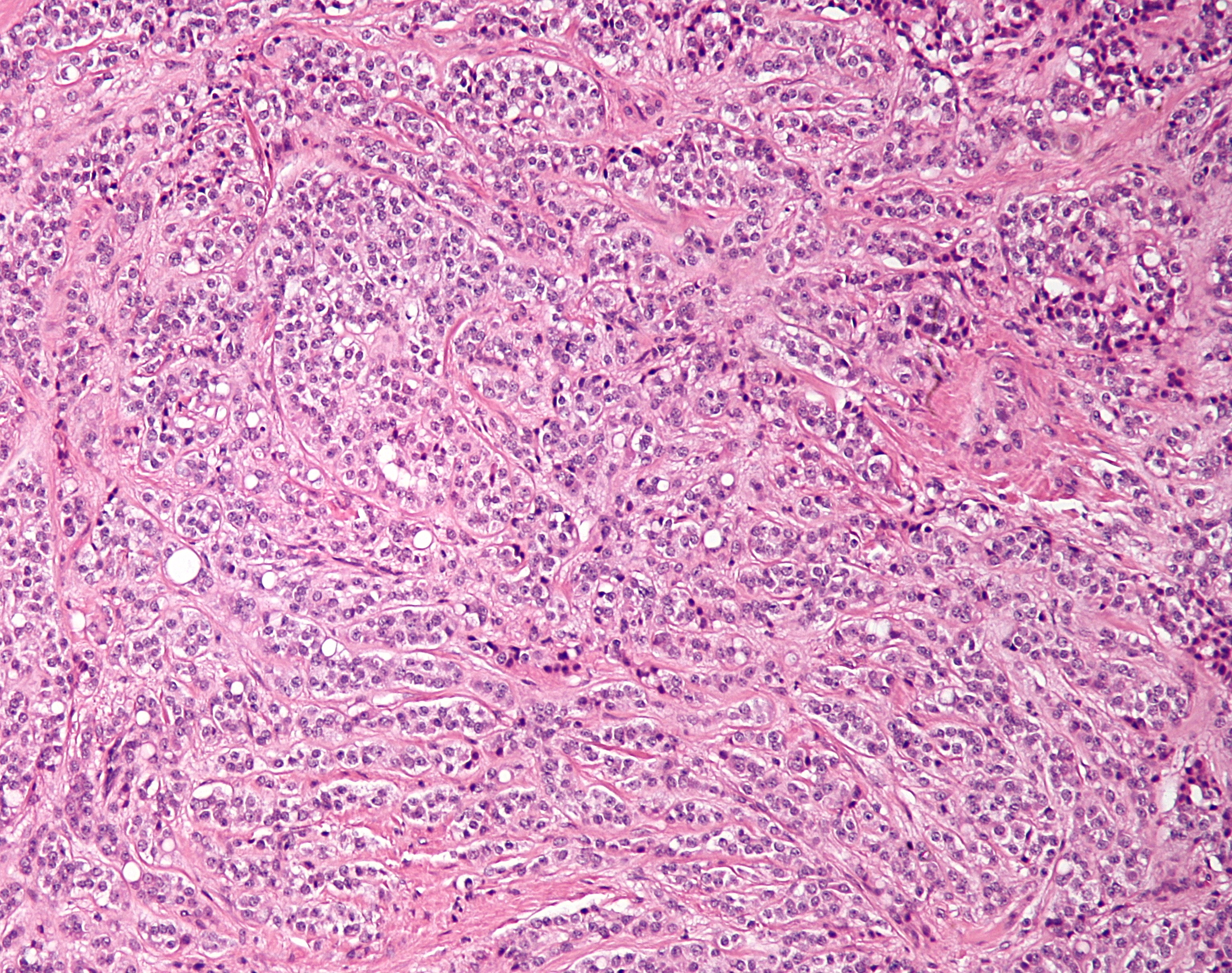
Low magnification micrograph of a Sertoli cell tumour. H&E stain.

On ultrasound, a Sertoli cell tumour appears as a hypoechoic intratesticular lesion which is usually solitary. However, the large cell subtype might present as multiple and bilateral masses with large areas of calcification. An MRI may also be conducted, but this typically is not definitive.

Microscopy and immunohistochemistry are the only way to give a definitive diagnosis, especially when there is a suspected seminoma.

== Treatment ==
In males, due to the difficulty in identifying the tumour using imaging techniques, an orchiectomy is often performed. The majority of Sertoli cell tumours are benign, so this is sufficient. There is no documented benefit of chemotherapy or radiotherapy.

== In non-humans ==
Sertoli cell tumors are known to occur in other species, including domestic ducks, dogs, and horses.

== Additional images ==
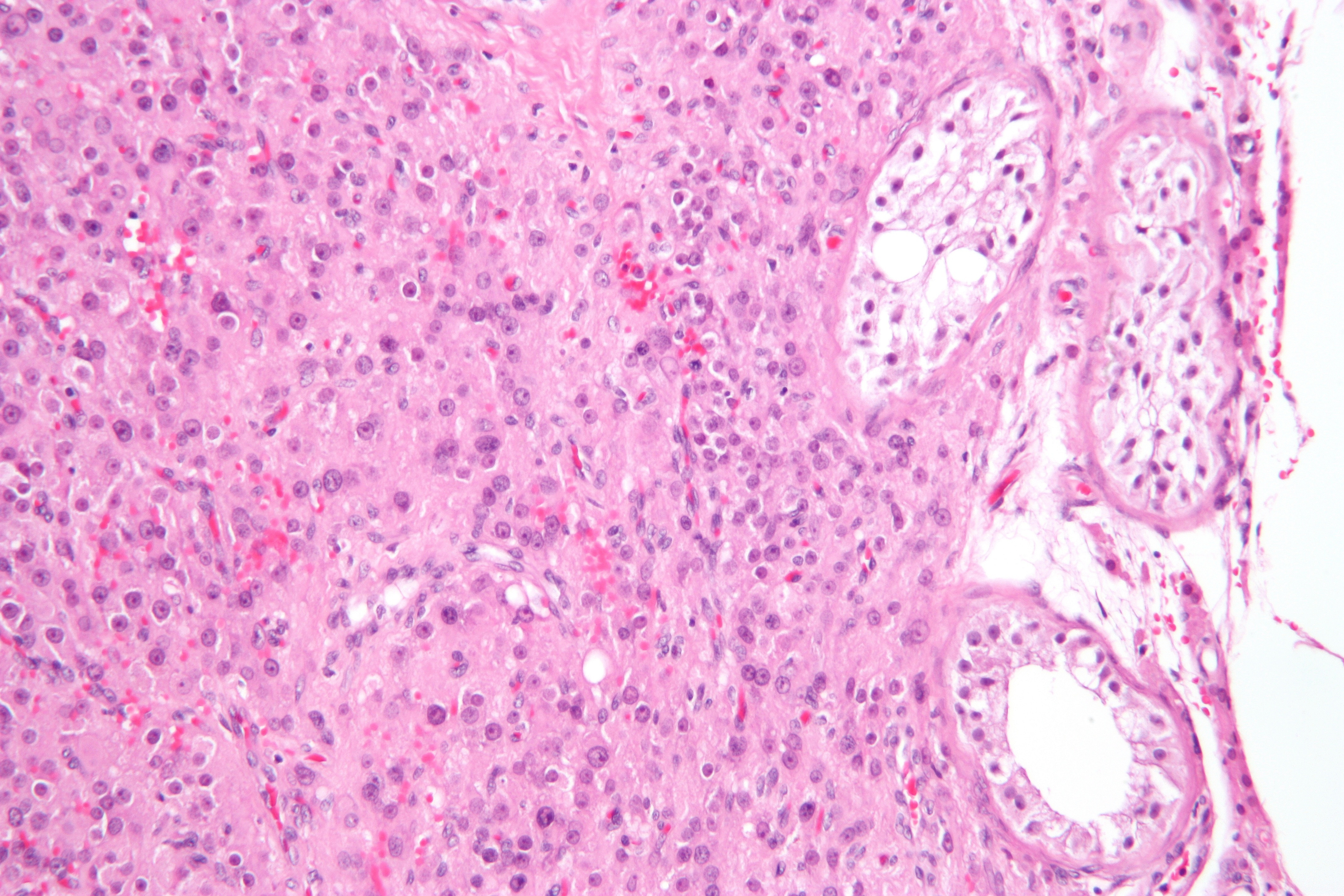
Micrograph of a Leydig cell tumour

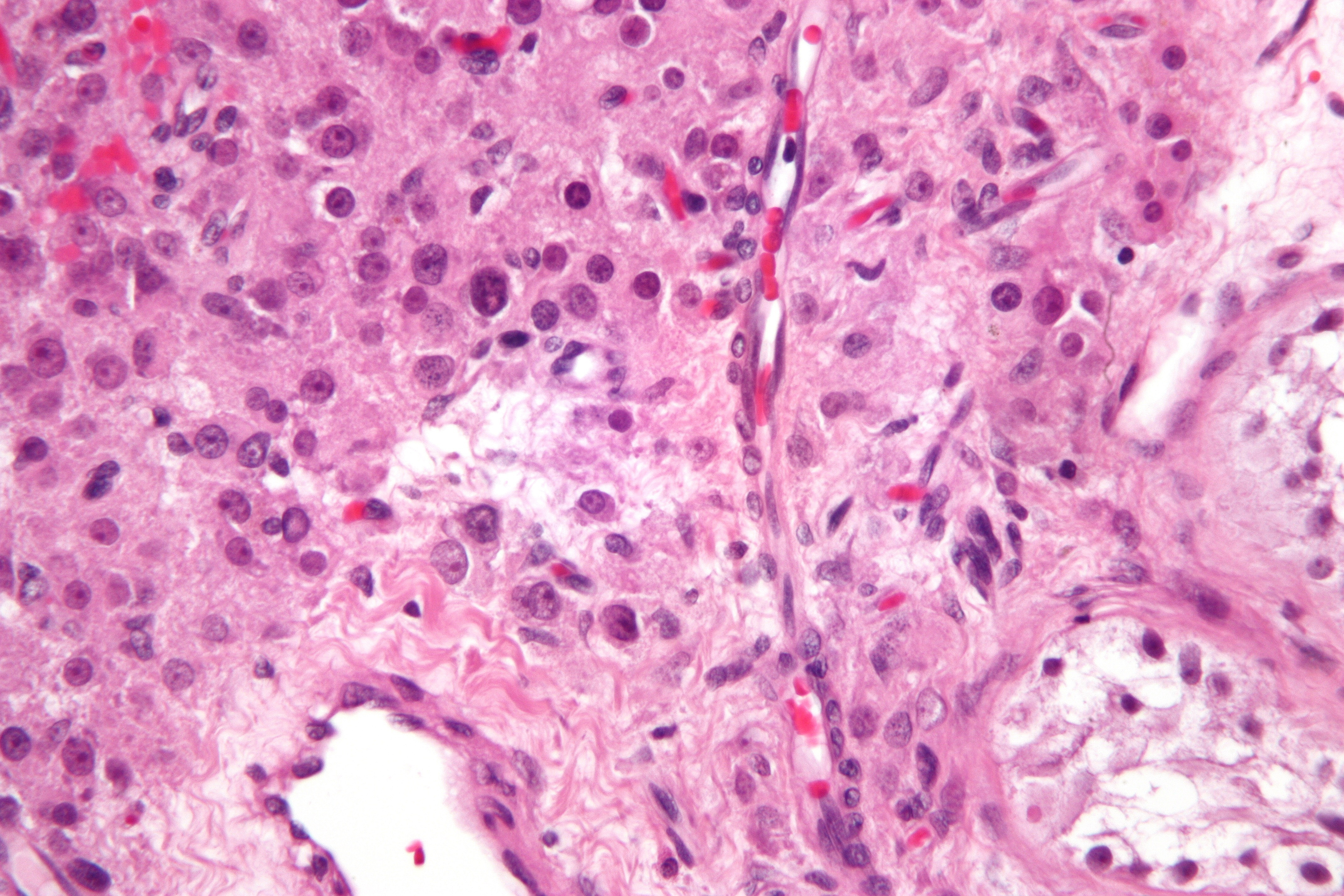
Micrograph of a Leydig cell tumour

== See also ==
- Androgen-dependent syndromes
- Leydig cell tumour
- Sertoli–Leydig cell tumour
- Sertoli cell nodule
