= Thecomas =

Ovarian tumor made of theca cells

Thecoma
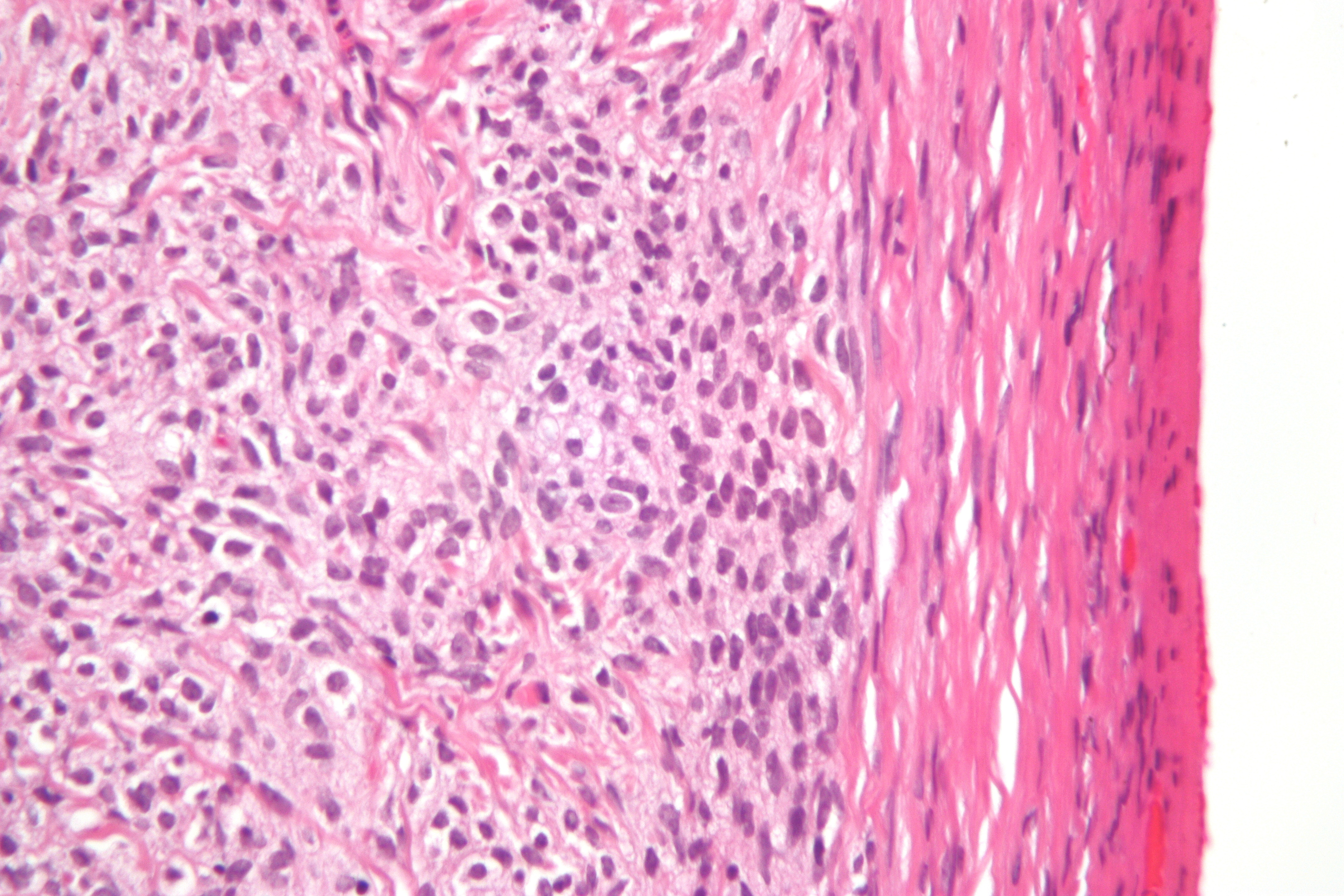
- High magnification micrograph of a thecoma. H&E stain.
- Specialty: Oncology

Thecomas or theca cell tumors are benign ovarian tumors composed only of theca cells. Histogenetically they are classified as sex cord-stromal tumours.

They are typically estrogen-producing and they occur in older women (mean age 59; 84% after menopause). (They can, however, appear before menopause.)

60% of patients present with abnormal uterine bleeding, and 20% have endometrial carcinoma.

== Pathologic features ==
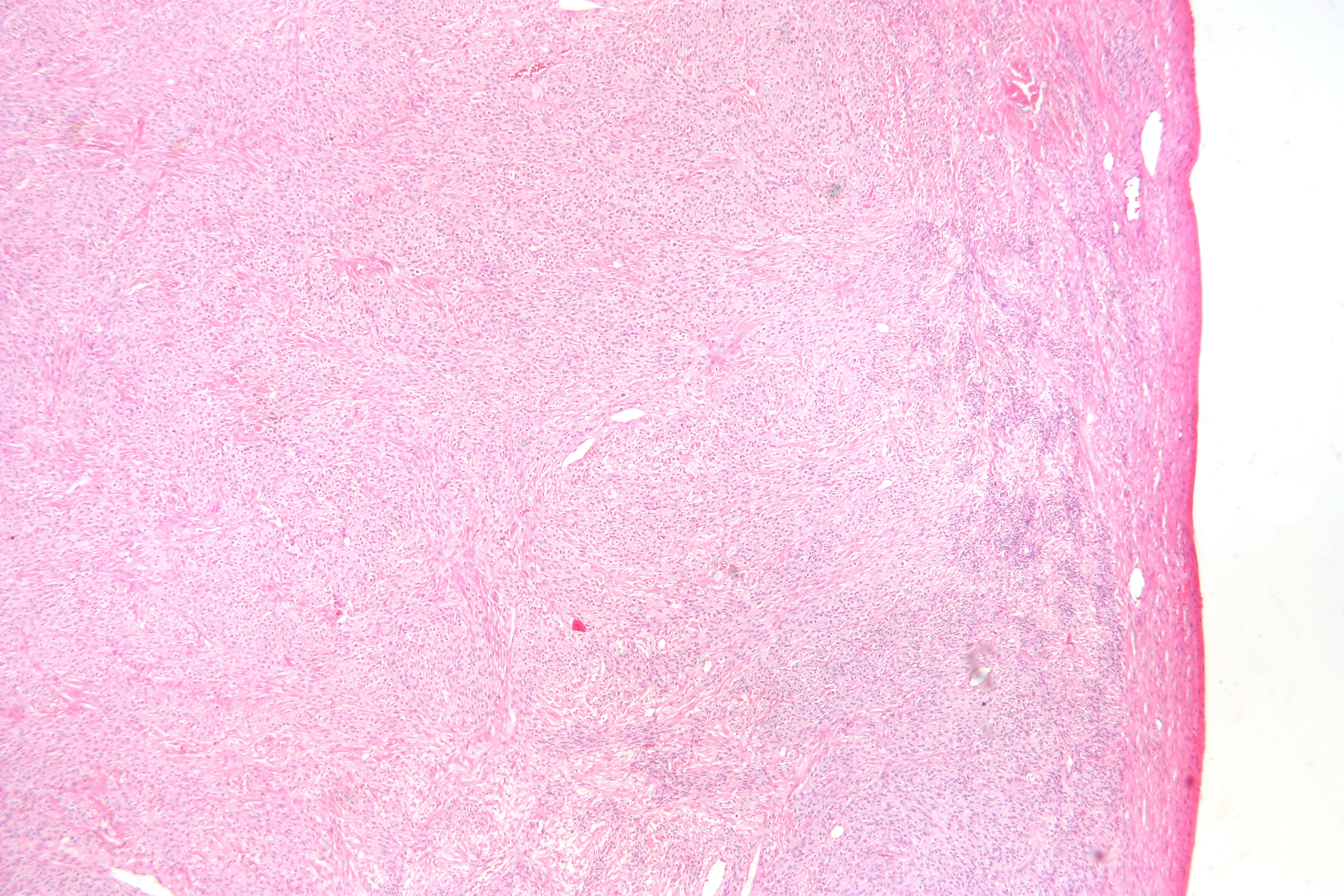
Low magnification micrograph of a thecoma showing compression of the ovarian cortex (right of image). H&E stain.

Grossly, the tumour is solid and yellow.

Grossly and microscopically, it consists of the ovarian cortex.

Microscopically, the tumour cells have abundant lipid-filled cytoplasm.
