= Leydig cell =

Androgen-producing cell adjacent to the seminiferous tubules of the testicle

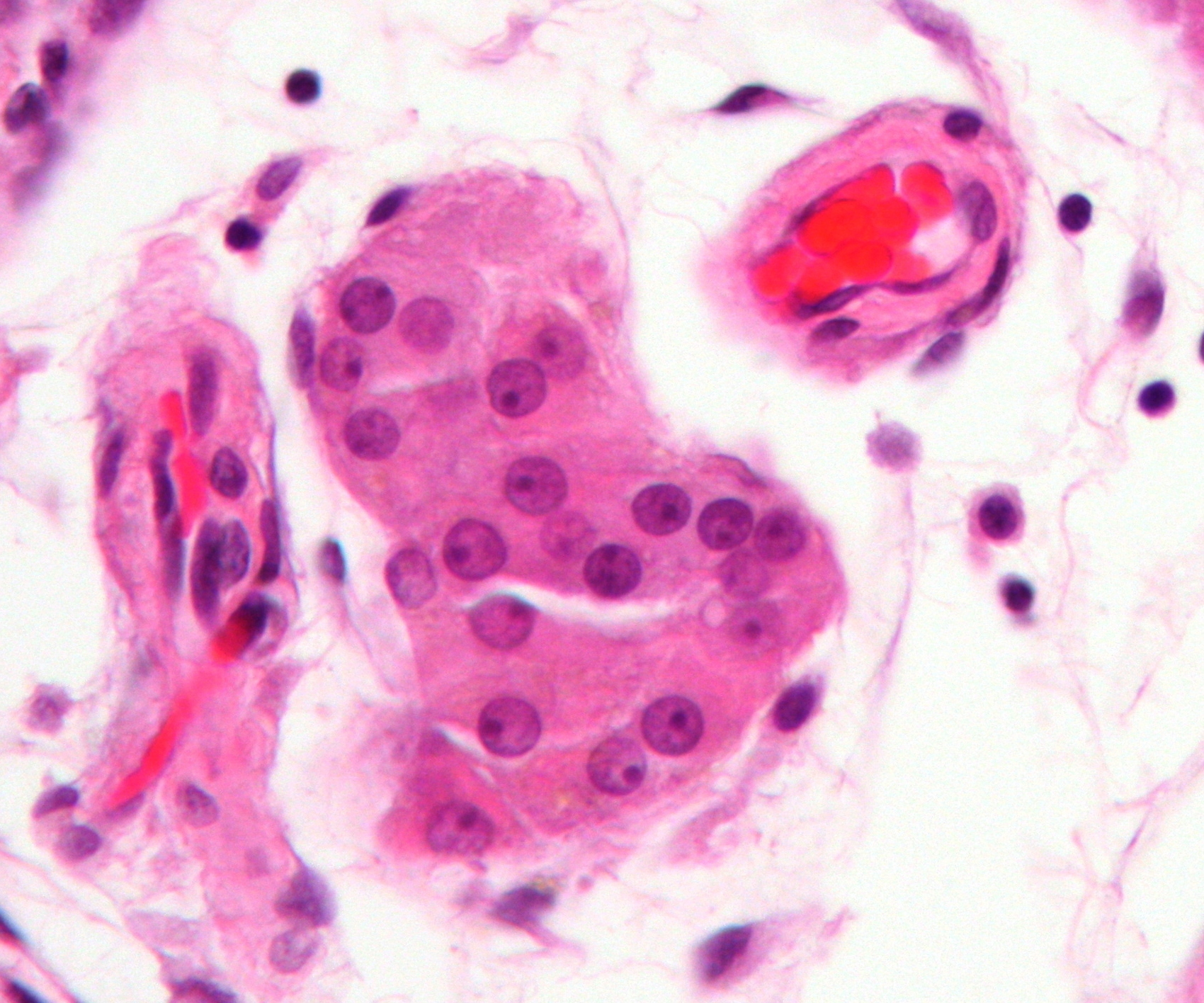
- Micrograph showing a cluster of Leydig cells (center of image). H&E stain.

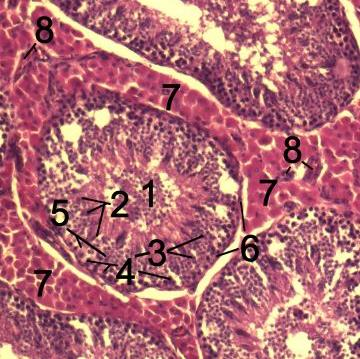
- Histological section through testicular parenchyma of a boar. 1 Lumen of convoluted part of the seminiferous tubules, 2 spermatids, 3 spermatocytes, 4 spermatogonia, 5 Sertoli cell, 6 myofibroblasts, 7 Leydig cells, 8 capillaries

Identifiers
- MeSH: D007985
- FMA: 72297

Leydig cells, also known as interstitial cells of the testes and interstitial cells of Leydig, are found adjacent to the seminiferous tubules in the testicle and produce testosterone in the presence of luteinizing hormone (LH). They are polyhedral in shape and have a large, prominent nucleus, an eosinophilic cytoplasm, and numerous lipid-filled vesicles. Males have two types of Leydig cells that appear in two distinct stages of development: the fetal type and the adult type.

== Structure ==
The mammalian Leydig cell is a polyhedral epithelioid cell with a single eccentrically located ovoid nucleus. The nucleus contains one to three prominent nucleoli and large amounts of dark-staining peripheral heterochromatin. The acidophilic cytoplasm usually contains numerous membrane-bound lipid droplets and large amounts of smooth endoplasmic reticulum (SER). Besides the abundance of SER with scattered patches of rough endoplasmic reticulum, several mitochondria are also prominent within the cytoplasm. Reinke crystals have lipofuscin pigment and rod-shaped crystal-like structures 3 to 20 micrometres in diameter.

=== Life cycle ===
Fetal-type Leydig cells are present from the 8th to the 20th week of gestation, which produce enough testosterone for masculinisation of a male fetus. It's unclear what they differentiate from (as of 2010). Their testosterone-producing precursors are demonstrably present in the 7th week of gestation. Starting from the 8th week, their growth and maintenance are supported by luteinizing hormone (LH). Dhh, PGDF-A, PGDF-B, GATA-4, and IGF receptor I may also play a role. They start to regress from the 20th week.

Adult-type Leydig cells differentiate in the postnatal testis and are dormant until puberty. They originate from Leydig stem cells, which resemble peritubular cells. The stem cells express PGDFRα but not LH receptor or steroidogenic enzymes. Sertoli cells secrete critical factors (LIF, PDGF-α Dhh) to trigger differentiation into progenitor Leydig cells. A combination of growth factors and hormones during puberty (LH, T_{3}, IGF-1, PDGF-α) trigger the progenitor cells to transition into immature Leydig cells, which are elongated and express high levels of steroidogenic enzymes. These immature cells turn into adult Leydig cells. Once present in a large enough number, the adult Leydig cells do not tend to divide further or be differentiated. Still, at least in mice, a mechanism exists to make more through differentiation when all Leydig cells are killed.

== Androgen production ==
Leydig cells release a class of hormones called androgens (19-carbon steroids). They secrete testosterone, androstenedione and dehydroepiandrosterone (DHEA), when stimulated by the luteinizing hormone (LH), which is released from the anterior pituitary in response to gonadotropin releasing hormone which in turn is released by the hypothalamus.

LH binds to its receptor (LHCGR) which is a G-protein coupled receptor and consequently increases the production of cAMP. cAMP, in turn through protein kinase A activation, stimulates cholesterol translocation from intracellular sources (primarily the plasma membrane and intracellular stores) to the mitochondria, firstly to the outer mitochondrial membrane and then cholesterol needs to be translocated to the inner mitochondrial membrane by steroidogenic acute regulatory protein, which is the rate-limiting step in steroid biosynthesis. This is followed by pregnenolone formation from the translocated cholesterol via the cholesterol side-chain cleavage enzyme, which is found in the inner mitochondrial membrane, eventually leading to testosterone synthesis and secretion by Leydig cells.

In rats, prolactin (PRL) increases the response of Leydig cells to LH by increasing the number of LH receptors expressed on Leydig cells.

== Clinical significance ==
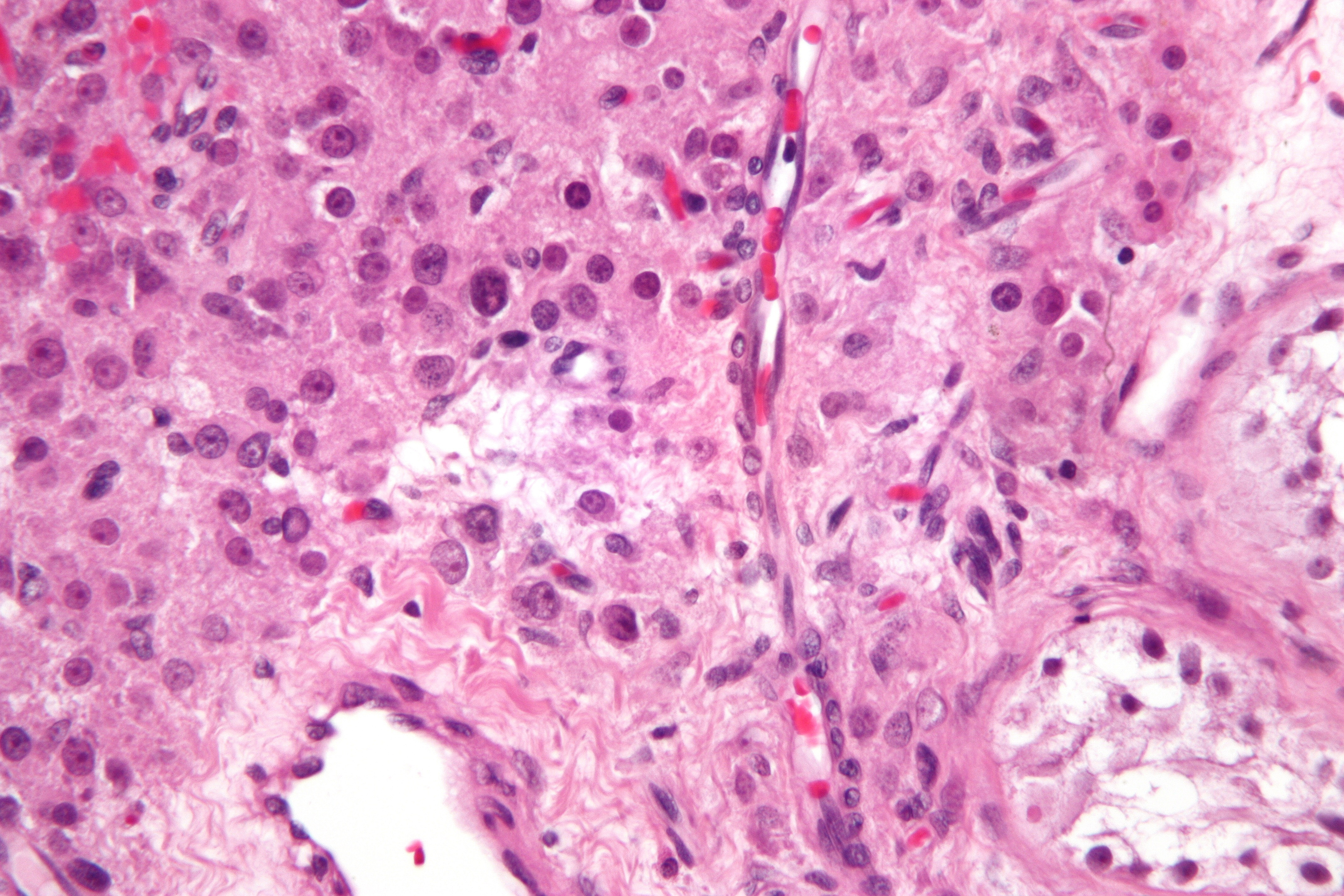
Micrograph of a Leydig cell tumour. H&E stain.

Leydig cells may grow uncontrollably and form a Leydig cell tumour. These may be hormonally active, i.e. secrete testosterone. The function of Reinke crystals is unknown, but they appear in the case of Leydig cell tumours. They are found in less than half of all Leydig cell tumors, but when present, they may serve to confirm the diagnosis of a Leydig cell tumor. No other interstitial cell within the testes has a nucleus or cytoplasm with these characteristics, making identification relatively easy.

While any age is susceptible to a Leydig cell tumour, Leydig cell tumours are more common in people aged 5 to 10 and 30 to 35. A Leydig cell tumour in a child usually causes precocious puberty. About 10% of boys with the tumour have gynecomastia. Although a Leydig cell tumour is always benign in children, it is malignant in 10% to 15% of adults. It is the most common testicular cancer of non-germ cell origin.

Sonography may be used to identify cystic areas, but it is unable to tell benign tumours apart from malignant tumours.

Adrenomyeloneuropathy is another example of a disease affecting the Leydig cell. In this case, a person's testosterone may fall despite higher-than-normal levels of LH and follicle-stimulating hormone (FSH).

== In the ovary ==
While Leydig cells are predominantly associated with testosterone production in the male testes, there is a type of ovarian hilus cell found in the ovaries of adult females. They mainly appear in the ovarian hilus, but can appear elsewhere in the ovary close to blood vessels and nerves. They are very similar to Leydig cells in function (producing testosterone) and morphology, and can arguably be called ovarian Leydig cells (OLCs). Every examined ovary in the 2017 study, healthy or diseased, has identifiable OLCs. They seem to differentiate from neural crest cells.

When overgrown the OLCs can cause abnormally high androgen levels. This usually happens after menopause. There are two cases:

- Leydig cell tumour, where the cells form a tumor.
  - Sertoli–Leydig cell tumour tends to happen in the second or the third decade of a woman's life. It has happened in a younger woman where it was initially mistaken as PCOS or CAH.
- Leydig cell hyperplasia, where there are only microscopic aggregates of OLC.

== Etymology ==
Leydig cells are named after the German anatomist Franz Leydig, who discovered them in 1850.

== Additional images ==
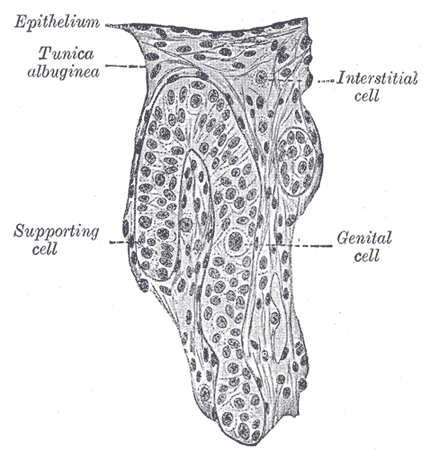
Section of a genital cord of the testis of a human embryo 3.5 cm long

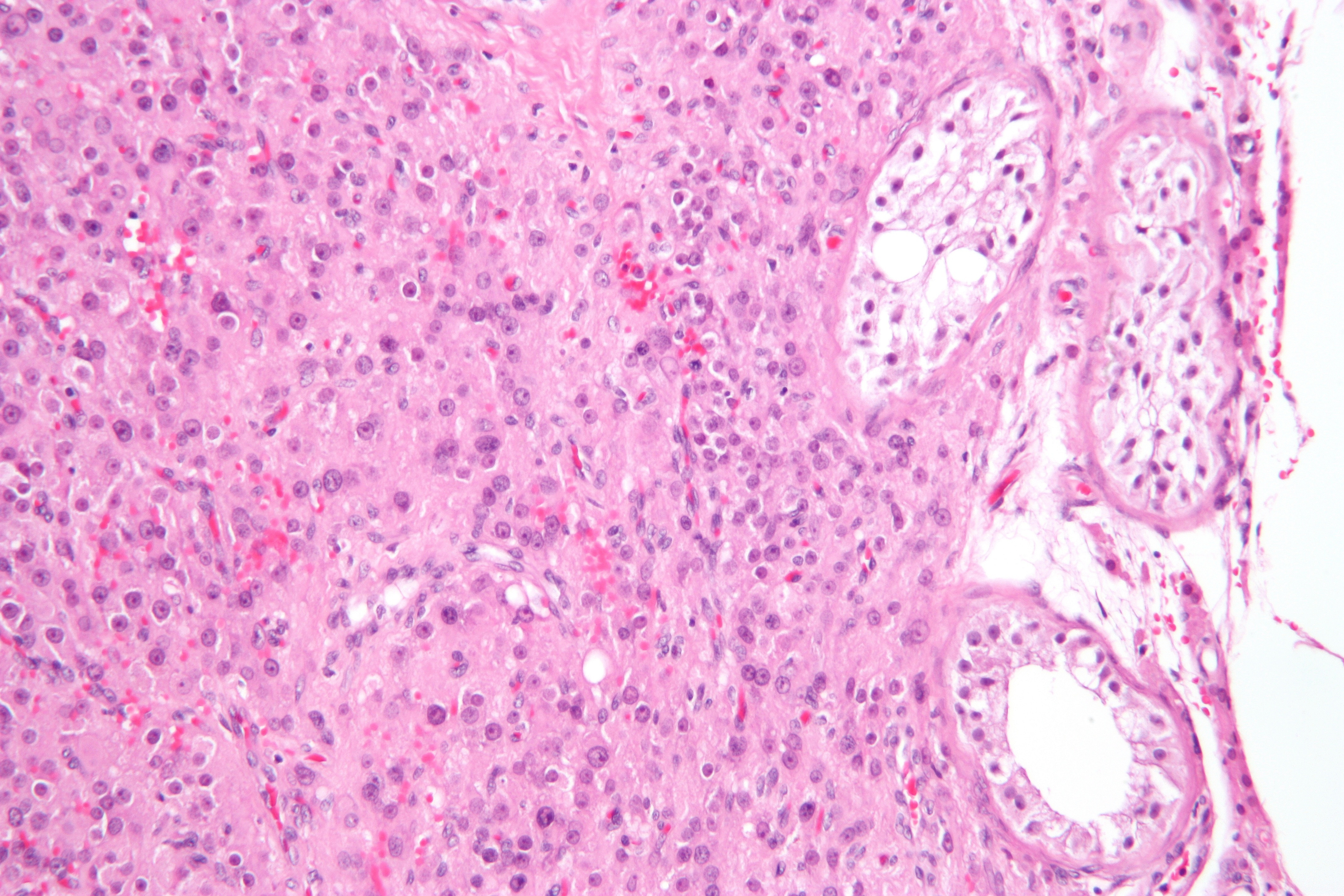
Intermediate magnification micrograph of a Leydig cell tumour, H&E stain

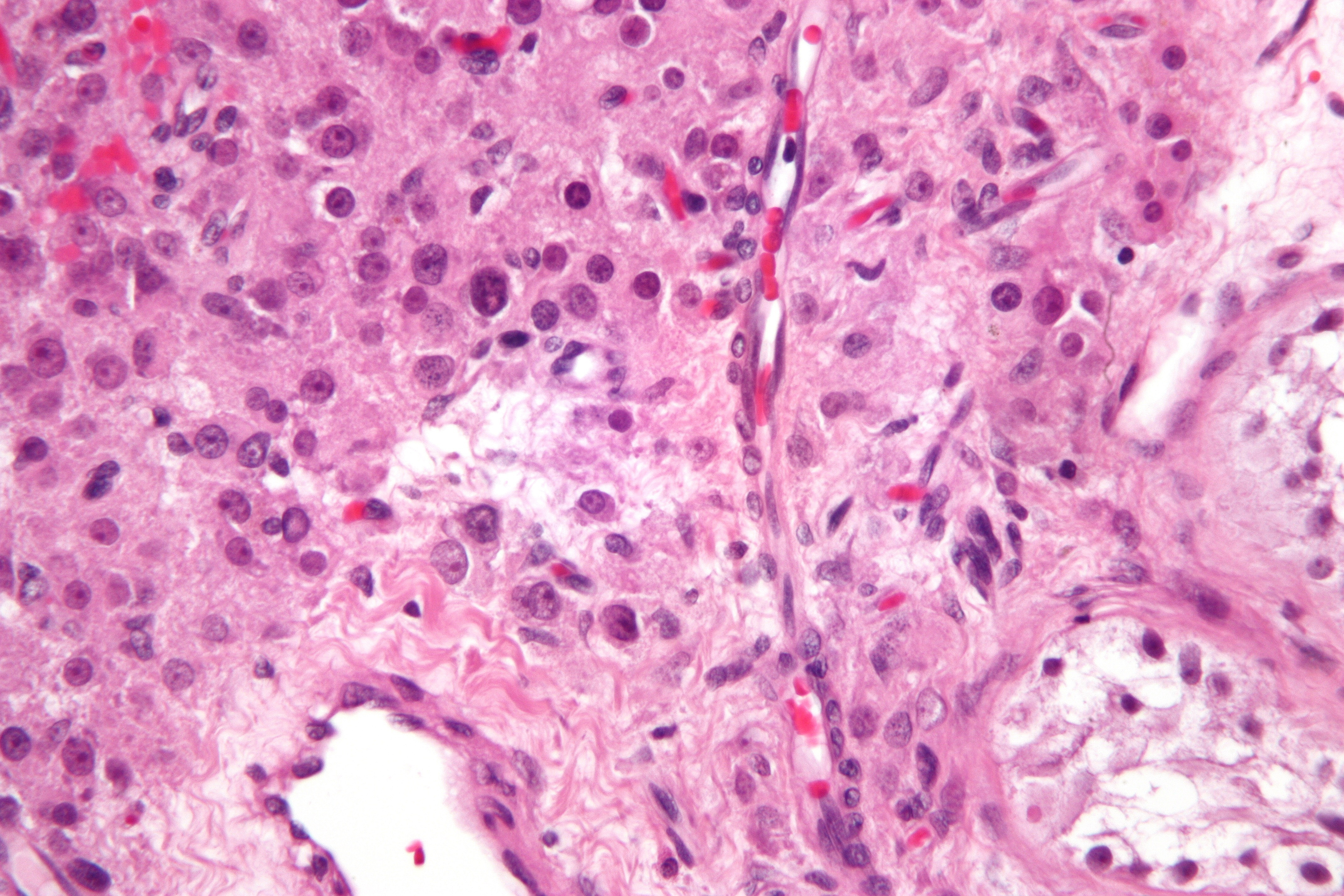
High magnification micrograph of a Leydig cell tumour, H&E stain

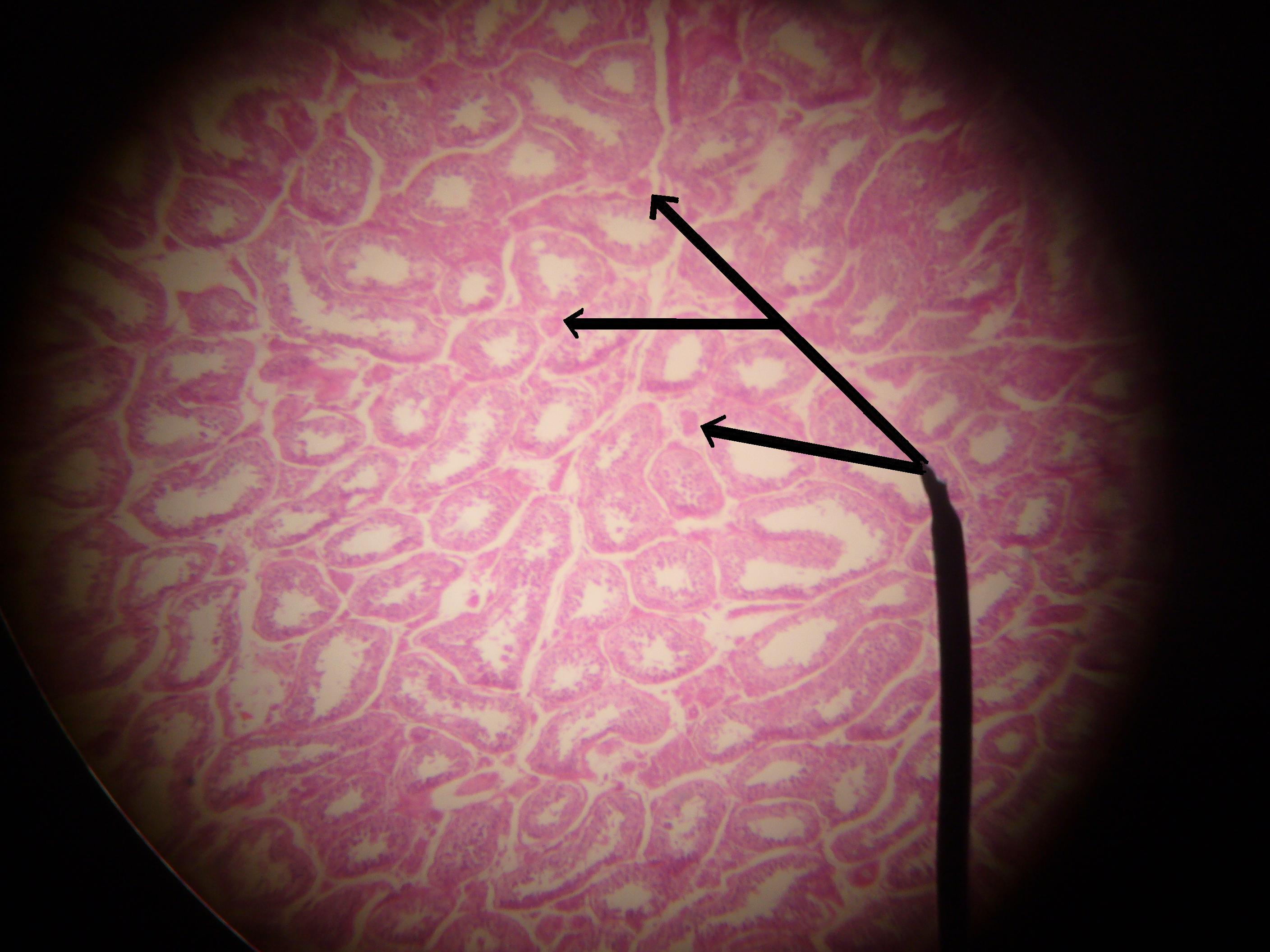
Cross-section of seminiferous tubules; arrows indicate location of Leydig cells

== See also ==
- Sertoli cell
- Sertoli-Leydig cell tumour
- List of human cell types derived from the germ layers
