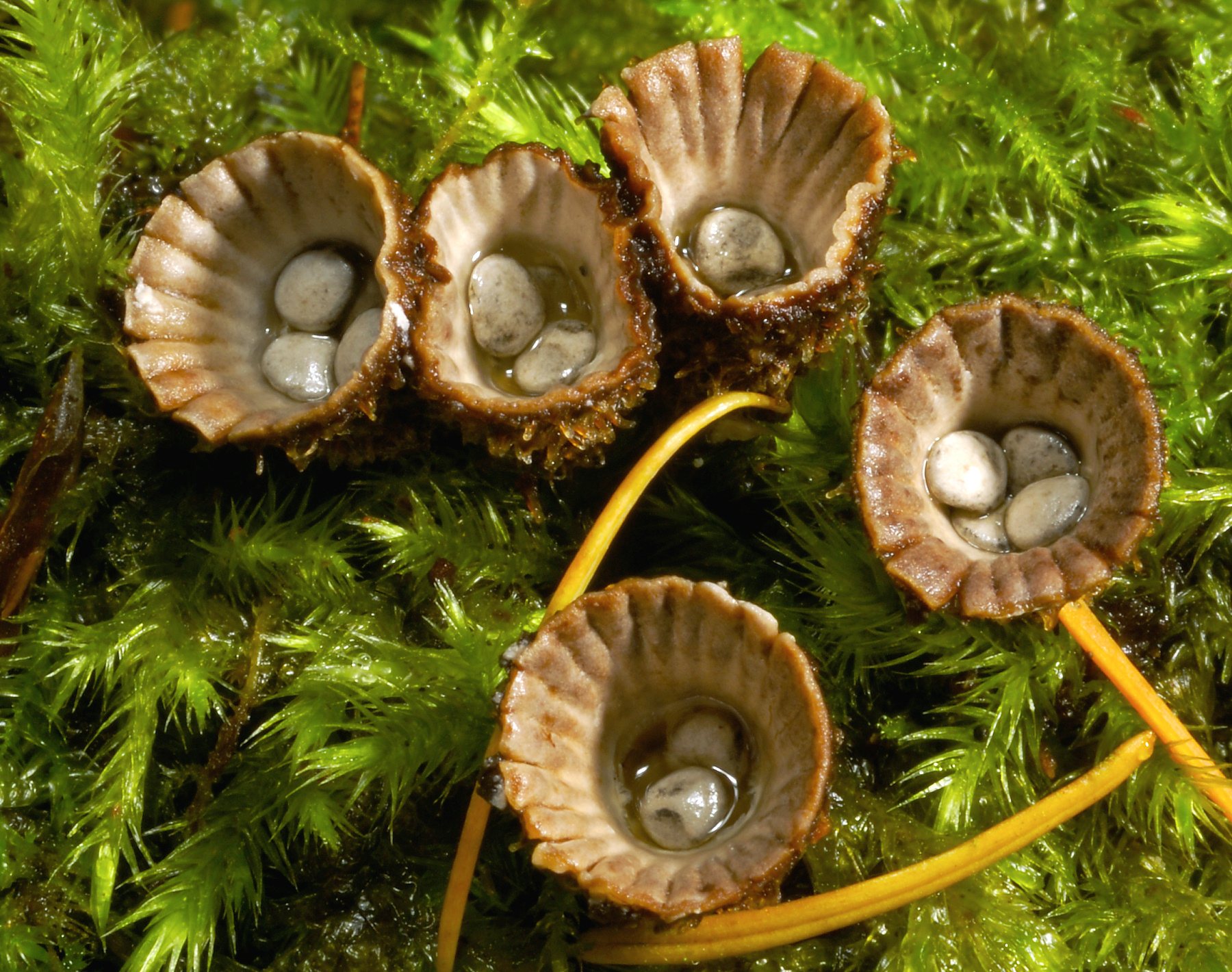
- Cyathus striatus

Scientific classification
- Kingdom: Fungi
- Division: Basidiomycota
- Class: Agaricomycetes
- Order: Agaricales
- Family: Nidulariaceae
- Genus: Cyathus; Haller (1768)

Type species
- Cyathus striatus (Huds.) Willd. (1787)

Species
- Approximately 100

= Cyathus =

Genus of fungi in the Nidulariaceae

Cyathus
- Mycological characteristics
- Glebal hymenium
- Cap is infundibuliform
- Hymenium attachment is not applicable
- Lacks a stipe
- Ecology is saprotrophic
- Edibility is inedible

Cyathus is a genus of fungi in the Nidulariaceae, which is a family collectively known as the bird's nest fungi. They are given this name as they resemble tiny bird's nests filled with "eggs" – structures large enough to have been mistaken in the past for seeds. However, these are now known to be reproductive structures containing spores. The "eggs", or peridioles, are firmly attached to the inner surface of this fruit body by an elastic cord of mycelia known as a funiculus. The 45 species are widely distributed throughout the world and some are found in most countries, although a few exist in only one or two locales. Cyathus stercoreus is considered endangered in a number of European countries. Some species of Cyathus are also known as splash cups, which refers to the fact that falling raindrops can knock the peridioles out of the open-cup fruit body. The internal and external surfaces of this cup may be ridged longitudinally (referred to as plicate or striate); this is one example of a taxonomic characteristic that has traditionally served to distinguish between species.

Generally considered inedible, Cyathus species are saprobic, since they obtain nutrients from decomposing organic matter. They usually grow on decaying wood or woody debris, on cow and horse dung, or directly on humus-rich soil. The life cycle of this genus allows it to reproduce both sexually, with meiosis, and asexually via spores. Several Cyathus species produce bioactive compounds, some with medicinal properties, and several lignin-degrading enzymes from the genus may be useful in bioremediation and agriculture. Phylogenetic analysis is providing new insights into the evolutionary relationships between the various species in Cyathus, and has cast doubt on the validity of the older classification systems that are based on traditional taxonomic characteristics.

== Taxonomy ==
=== History ===
Bird's nest fungi were first mentioned by Flemish botanist Carolus Clusius in Rariorum plantarum historia (1601). Over the next couple of centuries, these fungi were the subject of some controversy regarding whether the peridioles were seeds, and the mechanism by which they were dispersed in nature. For example, the French botanist Jean-Jacques Paulet, in his work Traité des champignons (1790–1793), proposed the erroneous notion that peridioles were ejected from the fruit bodies by some sort of spring mechanism. The genus was established in 1768 by the Swiss scientist Albrecht von Haller; the generic name Cyathus is Latin, but it was originally derived from the Ancient Greek word κύαθος, meaning 'cup'. The structure and biology of the genus Cyathus was better known by the mid-19th century, starting with the appearance in 1842 of a paper by Carl Johann Friedrich Schmitz, and two years later, a monograph by the brothers Louis René and Charles Tulasne. The work of the Tulasnes was thorough and accurate, and was highly regarded by later researchers. Subsequently, monographs were written in 1902 by Violet S. White (on American species), Curtis Gates Lloyd in 1906, Gordon Herriot Cunningham in 1924 (on New Zealand species), and Harold J. Brodie in 1975.

==== Infrageneric classification ====
The genus Cyathus was first subdivided into two infrageneric groups (i.e., grouping species below the rank of genus) by the Tulasne brothers; the "eucyathus" group had fruit bodies with inner surfaces folded into pleats (plications), while the "olla" group lacked plications. Later (1906), Lloyd published a different concept of infrageneric grouping in Cyathus, describing five groups, two in the eucyathus group and five in the olla group.

In the 1970s, Brodie, in his monograph on bird's nest fungi, separated the genus Cyathus into seven related groups based on a number of taxonomic characteristics, including the presence or absence of plications, the structure of the peridioles, the color of the fruit bodies, and the nature of the hairs on the outer peridium:

- Olla group: Species with a tomentum having fine flattened-down hairs, and no plications.
  - C. olla, C. africanus, C. badius, C. canna, C. colensoi, C. confusus, C. earlei, C. hookeri, C. microsporus, C. minimus, C. pygmaeus
- Pallidus group: Species with conspicuous, long, downward-pointing hairs, and a smooth (non-plicate) inner peridium.
  - C. pallidus, C. julietae
- Triplex group: Species with mostly dark-colored peridia, and a silvery white inner surface.
  - C. triplex, C. setosus, C. sinensis
- Gracilis group: Species with tomentum hairs clumped into tufts or mounds.
  - C. gracilis, C. intermedius, C. crassimurus, C. elmeri
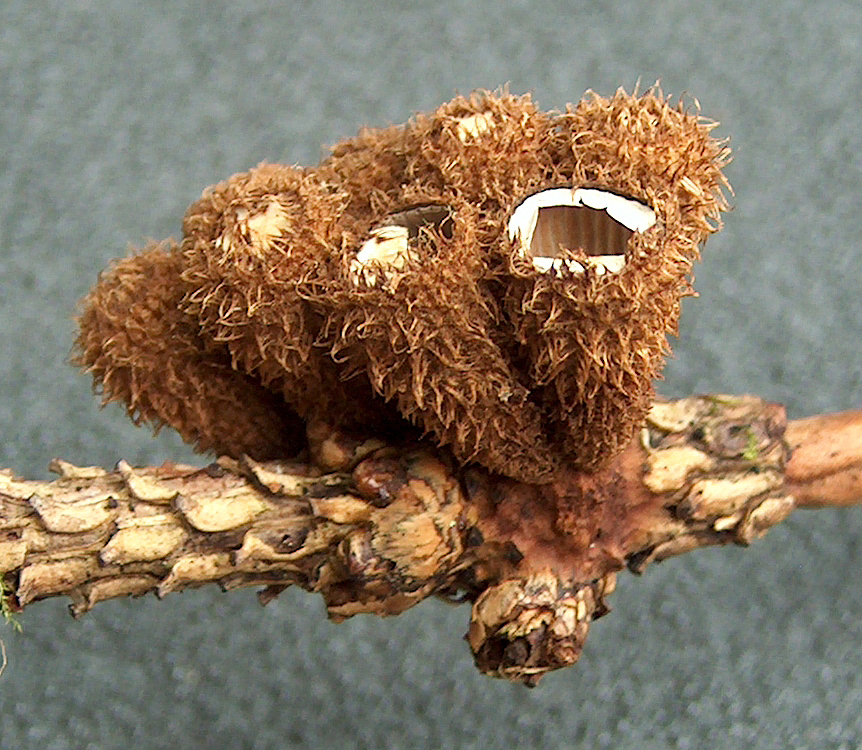
    The shaggy (tomentose) outer peridial surface of C. striatus
- Stercoreus group: Species with non-plicate peridia, shaggy or wooly outer peridium walls, and dark to black peridioles.
  - C. stercoreus, C. pictus, C. fimicola
- Poeppigii group: Species with plicate internal peridial walls, hairy to shaggy outer walls, dark to black peridioles, and large, roughly spherical or ellipsoidal spores.
  - C. poeppigii, C. crispus, C. limbatus, C. gayanus, C. costatus, C. cheliensis, C. olivaceo-brunneus
- Striatus group: Species with plicate internal peridia, hairy to shaggy outer peridia, and mostly elliptical spores.
  - C. striatus, C. annulatus, C. berkeleyanus, C. bulleri, C. chevalieri, C. ellipsoideus, C. helenae, C. montagnei, C. nigro-albus, C. novae-zeelandiae, C. pullus, C. rudis

=== Phylogeny ===
The 2007 publication of phylogenetic analyses of DNA sequence data of numerous Cyathus species has cast doubt on the validity of the morphology-based infrageneric classifications described by Brodie. This research suggests that Cyathus species can be grouped into three genetically related clades:

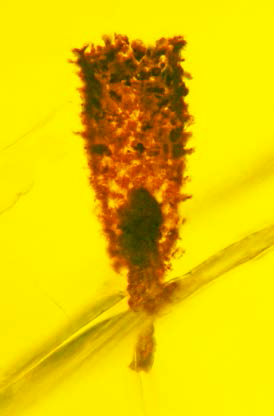
C. dominicanus, an extinct species

- Ollum group:
  - C. africanus (type), C. africanus f. latisporus, C. conlensoi, C. griseocarpus, C. guandishanensis, C. hookeri, C. jiayuguanensis, C. olla, C. olla f. anglicus, and C. olla f. brodiensis.
- Striatum group:
  - C. annulatus, C. crassimurus, C. helenae, C. poeppigii, C. renwei, C. setosus, C. stercoreus, and C. triplex.
- Pallidum group:
  - C. berkeleyanus, C. olla f. lanatus, C. gansuensis, and C. pallidus.

This analysis shows that rather than fruit body structure, spore size is generally a more reliable character for segregating species groups in Cyathus. For example, species in the ollum clade all have spore lengths less than 15 μm, while all members of the pallidum group have lengths greater than 15 μm; the striatum group, however, cannot be distinguished from the pallidum group by spore size alone. Two characteristics are most suited for distinguishing members of the ollum group from the pallidum group: the thickness of the hair layer on the peridium surface, and the outline of the fruit bodies. The tomentum of Pallidum species is thick, like felt, and typically aggregates into clumps of shaggy or woolly hair. Their crucible-shaped fruit bodies do not have a clearly differentiated stipe. The exoperidium of Ollum species, in comparison, has a thin tomentum of fine hairs; fruit bodies are funnel-shaped and have either a constricted base or a distinct stipe.

== Description ==
Species in the genus Cyathus have fruit bodies (peridia) that are vase-, trumpet- or urn-shaped with dimensions of 4–8 millimetres (3/16–5/16 inch) wide by 7–18 mm (1/4–11/16 in) tall. Fruit bodies are brown to gray-brown in color, and covered with small hair-like structures on the outer surface. Some species, like C. striatus and C. setosus, have conspicuous bristles called setae on the rim of the cup. The fruit body is often expanded at the base into a solid rounded mass of hyphae called an emplacement, which typically becomes tangled and entwined with small fragments of the underlying growing surface, improving its stability and helping it from being knocked over by rain.

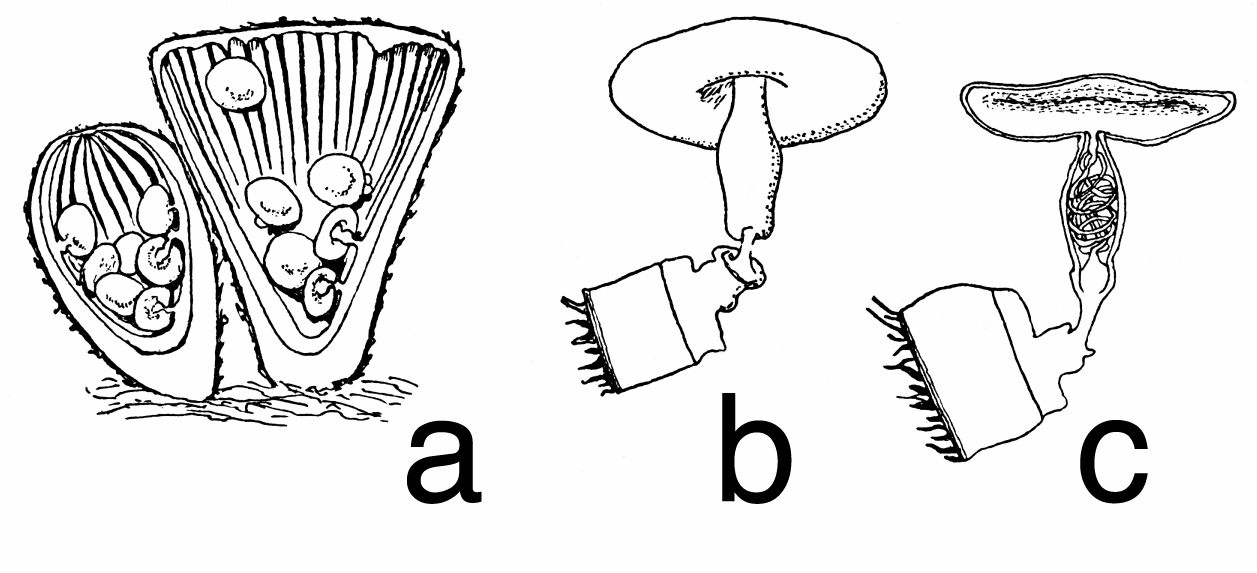
Cyathus striatus (a) young and mature fruit bodies in longitudinal section; (b), (c) single peridiole entire, and in section

Immature fruit bodies have a whitish membrane, an epiphragm, that covers the peridium opening when young, but eventually dehisces, breaking open during maturation. Viewed with a microscope, the peridium of Cyathus species is made of three distinct layers—the endo-, meso-, and ectoperidium, referring to the inner, middle, and outer layers respectively. While the surface of the ectoperidium in Cyathus is usually hairy, the endoperidial surface is smooth, and depending on the species, may have longitudinal grooves (striations).

Because the basic fruit body structure in all genera of the family Nidulariaceae is essentially similar, Cyathus may be readily confused with species of Nidula or Crucibulum, especially older, weathered specimens of Cyathus that may have the hairy ectoperidium worn off. It distinguished from Nidula by the presence of a funiculus, a cord of hyphae attaching the peridiole to the endoperidium. Cyathus differs from genus Crucibulum by having a distinct three-layered wall and a more intricate funiculus.

=== Peridiole structure ===
A peridiole and attached funiculus in cross section: a: tunica; b: spores; c: basidia; d: purse; e: funicular cord; f: hapteron; g: middle piece

Derived from the Greek word peridion, meaning "small leather pouch", the peridiole is the "egg" of the bird's nest. It is a mass of basidiospores and glebal tissue enclosed by a hard and waxy outer shell. The shape may be described as lenticular—like a biconvex lens—and depending on the species, may range in color from whitish to grayish to black. The interior chamber of the peridiole contains a hymenium that is made of basidia, sterile (non-reproductive) structures, and spores. In young, freshly opened fruit bodies, the peridioles lie in a clear gelatinous substance which soon dries.

Peridioles are attached to the fruit body by a funiculus, a complex structure of hyphae that may be differentiated into three regions: the basal piece, which attaches it to the inner wall of the peridium, the middle piece, and an upper sheath, called the purse, connected to the lower surface of the peridiole. In the purse and middle piece is a coiled thread of interwoven hyphae called the funicular cord, attached at one end to the peridiole and at the other end to an entangled mass of hyphae called the hapteron. In some species the peridioles may be covered by a tunica, a thin white membrane (particularly evident in C. striatus and C. crassimurus). Spores typically have an elliptical or roughly spherical shape, and are thick-walled, hyaline or light yellow-brown in color, with dimensions of 5–15 by 5–8 μm.

=== Life cycle ===
The life cycle of the genus Cyathus, which contains both haploid and diploid stages, is typical of taxa in the basidiomycetes that can reproduce both asexually (via vegetative spores), or sexually (with meiosis). Like other wood-decay fungi, this life cycle may be considered as two functionally different phases: the vegetative stage for the spread of mycelia, and the reproductive stage for the establishment of spore-producing structures, the fruit bodies.

The vegetative stage encompasses those phases of the life cycle involved with the germination, spread, and survival of the mycelium. Spores germinate under suitable conditions of moisture and temperature, and grow into branching filaments called hyphae, pushing out like roots into the rotting wood. These hyphae are homokaryotic, containing a single nucleus in each compartment; they increase in length by adding cell-wall material to a growing tip. As these tips expand and spread to produce new growing points, a network called the mycelium develops. Mycelial growth occurs by mitosis and the synthesis of hyphal biomass. When two homokaryotic hyphae of different mating compatibility groups fuse with one another, they form a dikaryotic mycelia in a process called plasmogamy. Prerequisites for mycelial survival and colonization a substrate (like rotting wood) include suitable humidity and nutrient availability. The majority of Cyathus species are saprobic, so mycelial growth in rotting wood is made possible by the secretion of enzymes that break down complex polysaccharides (such as cellulose and lignin) into simple sugars that can be used as nutrients.

After a period of time and under the appropriate environmental conditions, the dikaryotic mycelia may enter the reproductive stage of the life cycle. Fruit body formation is influenced by external factors such as season (which affects temperature and air humidity), nutrients and light. As fruit bodies develop they produce peridioles containing the basidia upon which new basidiospores are made. Young basidia contain a pair of haploid sexually compatible nuclei which fuse, and the resulting diploid fusion nucleus undergoes meiosis to produce basidiospores, each containing a single haploid nucleus. The dikaryotic mycelia from which the fruit bodies are produced is long lasting, and will continue to produce successive generations of fruit bodies as long as the environmental conditions are favorable.

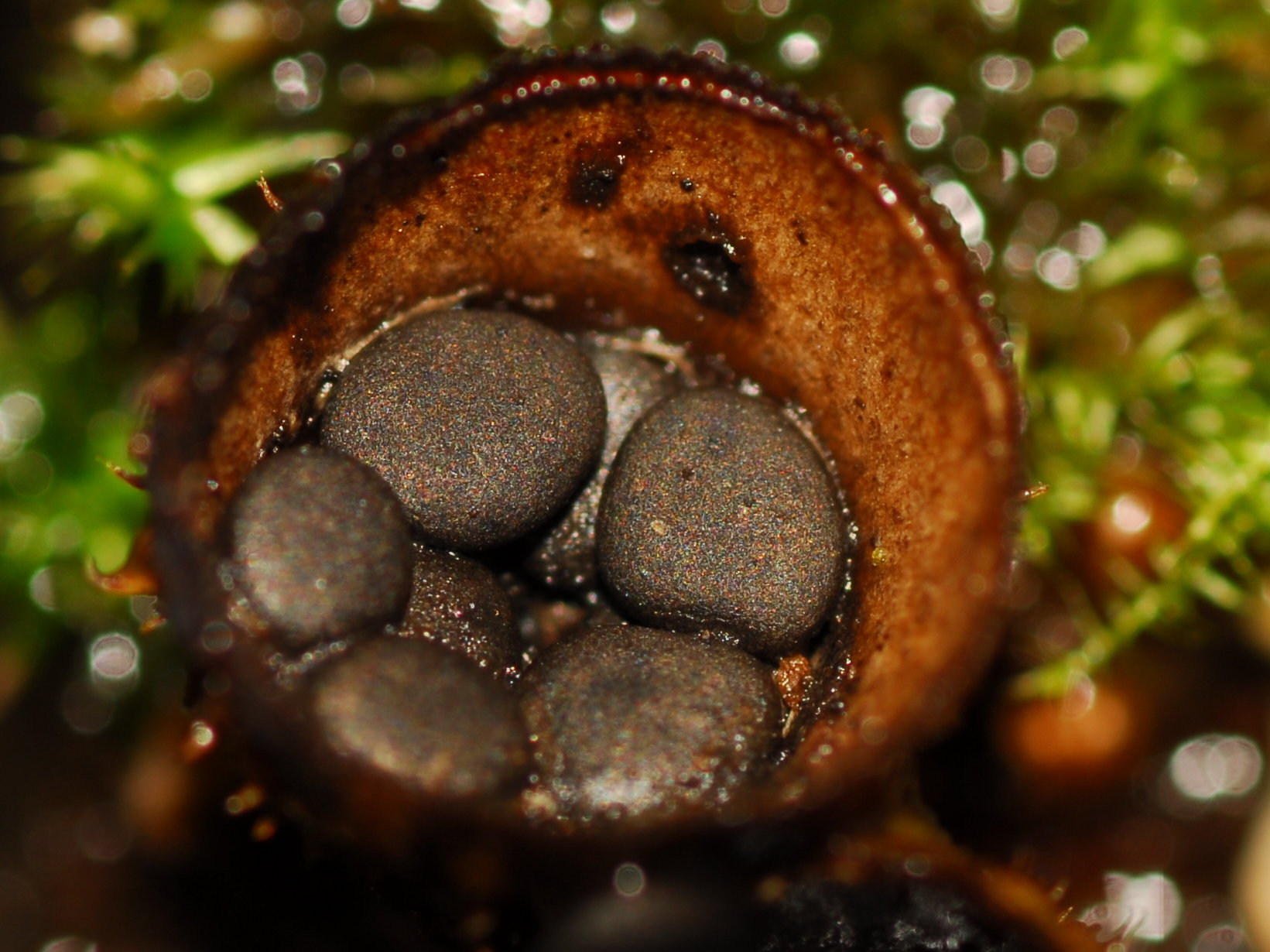
Cyathus stercoreus

The development of Cyathus fruit bodies has been studied in laboratory culture; C. stercoreus has been used most often for these studies due to the ease with which it may be grown experimentally. In 1958, E. Garnett first demonstrated that the development and form of the fruit bodies is at least partially dependent on the intensity of light it receives during development. For example, exposure of the heterokaryotic mycelium to light is required for fruit to occur, and furthermore, this light needs to be at a wavelength of less than 530 nm. Continuous light is not required for fruit body development; after the mycelium has reached a certain stage of maturity, only a brief exposure to light is necessary, and fruit bodies will form if even subsequently kept in the dark. Lu suggested in 1965 that certain growing conditions—such as a shortage in available nutrients—shifts the fungus' metabolism to produce a hypothetical "photoreceptive precursor" that enables the growth of the fruit bodies to be stimulated and affected by light. The fungi is also positively phototropic, that is, it will orient its fruit bodies in the direction of the light source. The time required to develop fruit bodies depends on a number of factors, such as the temperature, or the availability and type of nutrients, but in general "most species that do fruit in laboratory culture do so best at about 25 °C, in from 18 to 40 days."

=== Bioactive compounds ===
Structures of cyathin A_{3} (left) and cyathuscavins (right)

A number of species of Cyathus produce metabolites with biological activity, and novel chemical structures that are specific to this genus. For example, cyathins are diterpenoid compounds produced by C. helenae, C. africanus and C. earlei. Several of the cyathins (especially cyathins B_{3} and C_{3}), including striatin compounds from C. striatus, show strong antibiotic activity. Cyathane diterpenoids also stimulate nerve growth factor synthesis, and have the potential to be developed into therapeutic agents for neurodegenerative disorders such as Alzheimer's disease. Compounds named cyathuscavins, isolated from the mycelial liquid culture of C. stercoreus, have significant antioxidant activity, as do the compounds known as cyathusals, also from C. stercoreus. Various sesquiterpene compounds have also been identified in C. bulleri, including cybrodol (derived from humulene), nidulol, and bullerone.

== Distribution and habitat ==
Fruit bodies typically grow in clusters, and are found on dead or decaying wood, or on woody fragments in cow or horse dung. Dung-loving (coprophilous) species include C. stercoreus, C. costatus, C. fimicola, and C. pygmaeus. Some species have been collected on woody material like dead herbaceous stems, the empty shells or husks of nuts, or on fibrous material like coconut, jute, or hemp fiber woven into matting, sacks or cloth. In nature, fruit bodies are usually found in moist, partly shaded sites, such as the edges of woods on trails, or around lighted openings in forests. They are less frequently found growing in dense vegetation and deep mosses, as these environments would interfere with the dispersal of peridioles by falling drops of water. The appearance of fruit bodies is largely dependent upon features of the immediate growing environment; specifically, optimum conditions of temperature, moisture, and nutrient availability are more important factors for fruit rather than the broad geographical area in which the fungi are located, or the season. Examples of the ability of Cyathus to thrive in somewhat inhospitable environments are provided by C. striatus and C. stercoreus, which can survive the drought and cold of winter in temperate North America, and the species C. helenae, which has been found growing on dead alpine plants at an altitude of 2,100 metres (7,000 ft).

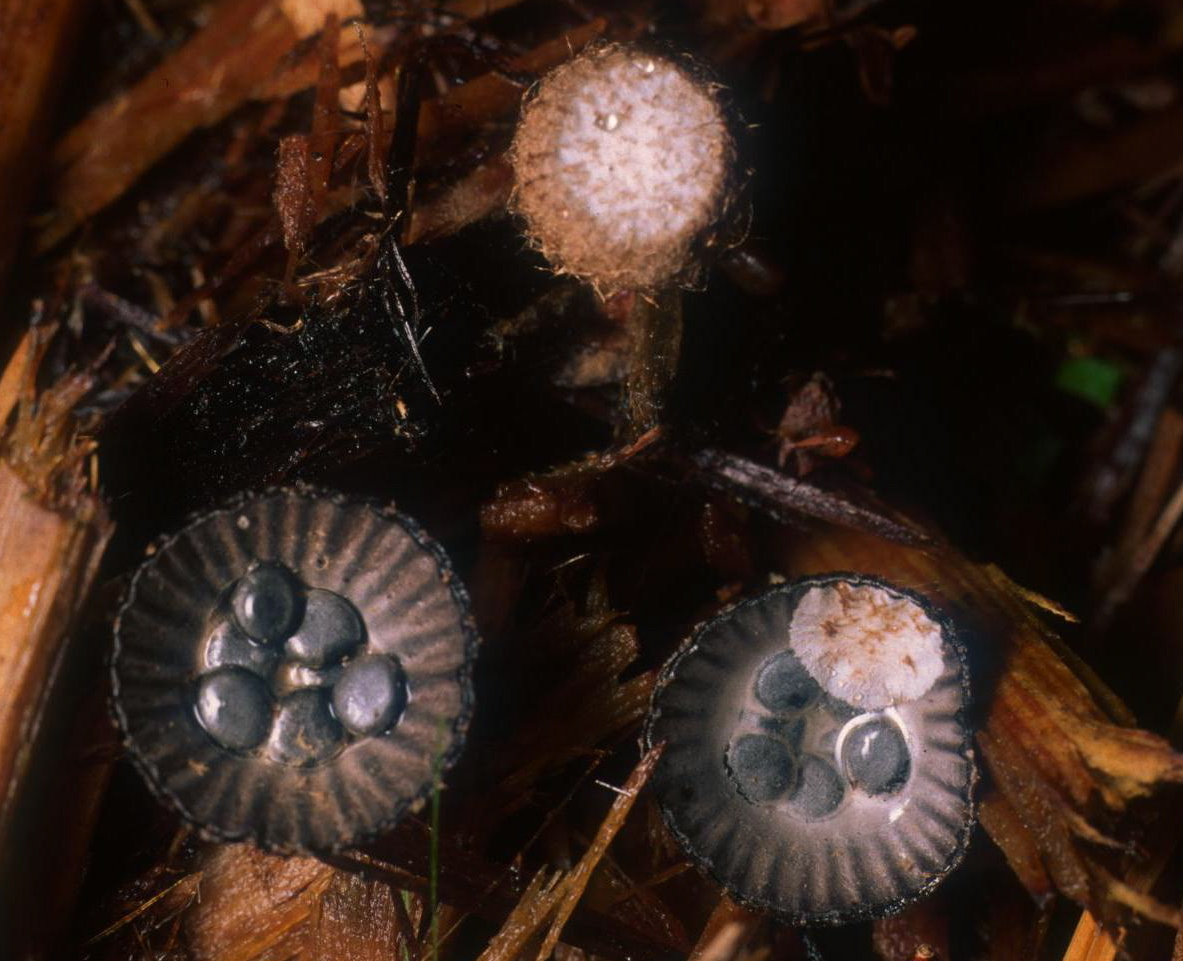
C. poeppigii, a tropical species

In general, species of Cyathus have a worldwide distribution, but are only rarely found in the arctic and subarctic. One of the best known species, C. striatus has a circumpolar distribution and is commonly found throughout temperate locations, while the morphologically similar C. poeppigii is widely spread in tropical areas, rarely in the subtropics, and never in temperate regions. The majority of species are native to warm climates. For example, although 20 different species have been reported from the United States and Canada, only 8 are commonly encountered; on the other hand, 25 species may be regularly found in the West Indies, and the Hawaiian Islands alone have 11 species. Some species seem to be endemic to certain regions, such as C. novae-zeelandiae found in New Zealand, or C. crassimurus, found only in Hawaii; however, this apparent endemism may just be a result of a lack of collections, rather than a difference in the habitat that constitutes a barrier to spread. Although widespread in the tropics and most of the temperate world, C. stercoreus is only rarely found in Europe; this has resulted in its appearance on a number of Red Lists. For example, it is considered endangered in Bulgaria, Denmark, and Montenegro, and "near threatened" in Great Britain. The discovery of a Cyathus species in Dominican amber (C. dominicanus) suggests that the basic form of the bird's nest fungi had already evolved by the Cretaceous era and that the group had diversified by the mid-Cenozoic.

== Ecology ==
=== Spore dispersal ===
Like other bird's nest fungi in the Nidulariaceae, species of Cyathus have their spores dispersed when water falls into the fruit body. The fruit body is shaped so that the kinetic energy of a fallen raindrop is redirected upward and slightly outward by the angle of the cup wall, which is consistently 70–75° with the horizontal. The action ejects the peridioles out of the so-called "splash cup", where it may break and spread the spores within, or be eaten and dispersed by animals after passing through the digestive tract. This method of spore dispersal in the Nidulariaceae was tested experimentally by George Willard Martin in 1924, and later elaborated by Arthur Henry Reginald Buller, who used C. striatus as the model species to experimentally investigate the phenomenon. Buller's major conclusions about spore dispersal were later summarized by his graduate student Harold J. Brodie, with whom he conducted several of these splash cup experiments:

Raindrops cause the peridioles of the Nidulariaceae to be thrown about four feet by splash action. In the genus Cyathus, as a peridiole is jerked out of its cup, the funiculus is torn and this makes possible the expansion of a mass of adhesive hyphae (the hapteron) which clings to any object in the line of flight. The momentum of the peridiole causes a long cord to be pulled out of a sheath attached to the peridiole. The peridiole is checked in flight and the jerk causes the funicular cord to become wound around stems or entangled among plant hairs. Thus the peridiole becomes attached to vegetation and may be eaten subsequently by herbivorous animals.

Although it has not been shown experimentally if the spores can survive the passage through an animal's digestive tract, the regular presence of Cyathus on cow or horse manure strongly suggest that this is true. Alternatively, the hard outer casing of peridioles ejected from splash cups may simply disintegrate over time, eventually releasing the spores within.

== Uses ==
Species in the family Nidulariaceae, including Cyathus, are considered inedible, as (in Brodie's words) they are "not sufficiently large, fleshy, or odorous to be of interest to humans as food". However, there have not been reports of poisonous alkaloids or other substances considered toxic to humans. Brodie goes on to note that two Cyathus species have been used by native peoples as an aphrodisiac, or to stimulate fertility: C. limbatus in Colombia, and C. microsporus in Guadeloupe. Whether these species have any actual effect on human physiology is unknown.

=== Biodegradation ===
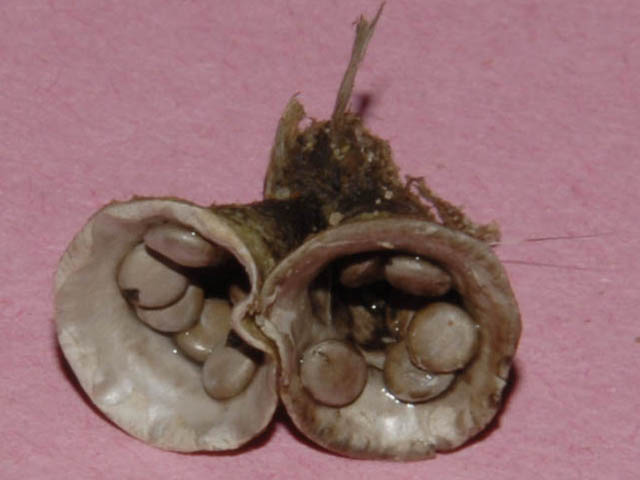
Cyathus olla; note the smooth (not plicate) endoperidium, and relatively large peridioles.

Lignin is a complex polymeric chemical compound that is a major constituent of wood. Resistant to biological decomposition, its presence in paper makes it weaker and more liable to discolor when exposed to light. The species C. bulleri contains three lignin-degrading enzymes: lignin peroxidase, manganese peroxidase, and laccase. These enzymes have potential applications not only in the pulp and paper industry, but also to increase the digestibility and protein content of forage for cattle. Because laccases can break down phenolic compounds they may be used to detoxify some environmental pollutants, such as dyes used in the textile industry. C. bulleri laccase has also been genetically engineered to be produced by Escherichia coli, making it the first fungal laccase to be produced in a bacterial host. C. pallidus can biodegrade the explosive compound RDX (hexahydro-1,3,5-trinitro-1,3,5-triazine), suggesting it might be used to decontaminate munitions-contaminated soils.

=== Agriculture ===
Cyathus olla has been investigated for its ability to accelerate the decomposition of stubble left in the field after harvest, effectively reducing pathogen populations and accelerating nutrient cycling through mineralization of essential plant nutrients.

=== Human biology ===
Various Cyathus species have antifungal activity against human pathogens such as Aspergillus fumigatus, Candida albicans and Cryptococcus neoformans. Extracts of C. striatus have inhibitory effects on NF-κB, a transcription factor responsible for regulating the expression of several genes involved in the immune system, inflammation, and cell death.

== Cited texts ==
- Alexopoulos CJ, Mims CW, Blackwell M (1996). Introductory Mycology (4th ed.). New York, New York: Wiley. ISBN 0-471-52229-5.
- Brodie HJ. (1975). The Bird's Nest Fungi. Toronto: University of Toronto Press. ISBN 0-8020-5307-6.
- Deacon J. (2005). Fungal Biology. Cambridge, Massachusetts: Blackwell Publishers. ISBN 1-4051-3066-0.
