= List of Cyathus species =

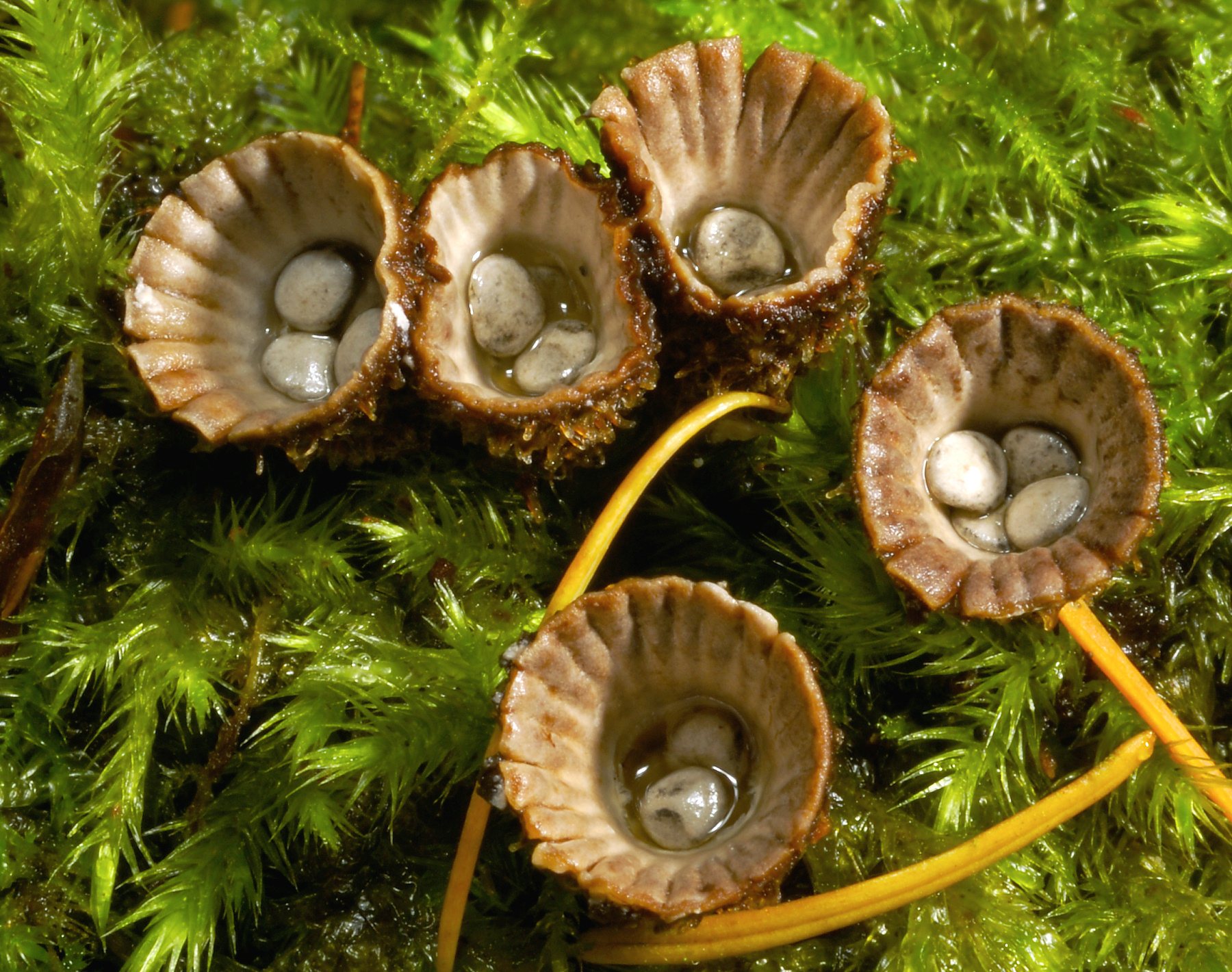
Cyathus striatus is the type species of genus Cyathus.

Cyathus is a genus of fungi in the family Nidulariaceae. Along with the genera Crucibulum, Mycocalia, Nidula and Nidularia, they are known collectively as the bird's nest fungi due to their small nest-like fruiting bodies containing egg-shaped peridioles. The genus Cyathus was monographed by mycologist Lloyd (1906), and later Brodie (1975, 1984), and their species concepts, especially those of Brodie (1975), are followed by most mycologists.

== Taxonomic characters ==
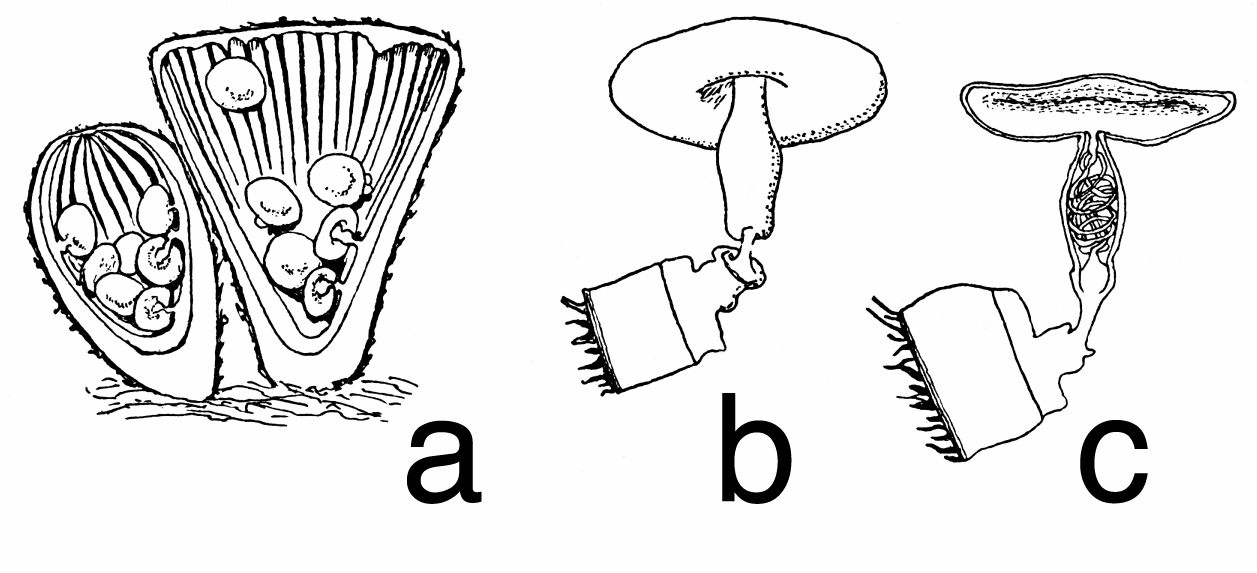
Cyathus striatus (a) young and mature fruiting bodies in longitudinal section; (b), (c) single peridiole entire and in section.

The differentiation of Cyathus species is based on observable characters, such as fruiting body shape, coverings and plications of peridia, and microscopic characteristics such as the anatomy of peridioles, and the size and shape of basidiospores. The following characters are used to help identify Cyathus species:

- Shape
- Size
- Color
- Peridium
- Plication means being folded in pleats.
- Setae are rigid bristles made of compacted hyphae that are sometimes found at the mouth of the peridium.
- The emplacement is the rounded mass of hyphae at the lower, narrow end of the fruiting body which attaches it to the growing surface.

Microscopic characters

- Tunica: a thin membrane that is the outermost covering layer of the peridioles.
- Cortex: in this article, the cortex refers to the tissue layer comprising the wall of the peridiole.
- Spores:

== Species ==
The following list of species is compiled from Brodie's monograph (1975) and subsequent revision (1984), as well as articles written since then describing new species or reducing others to synonymy.

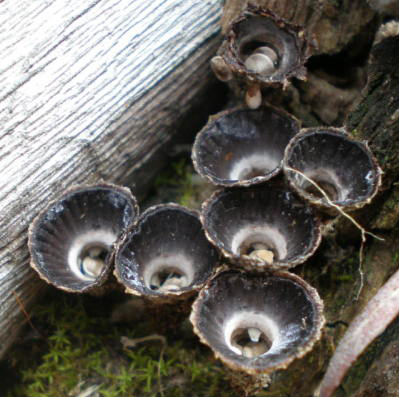
Cyathus helenae

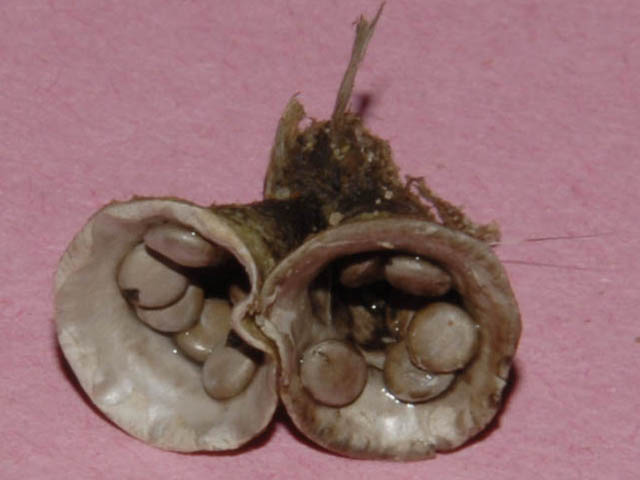
Cyathus olla

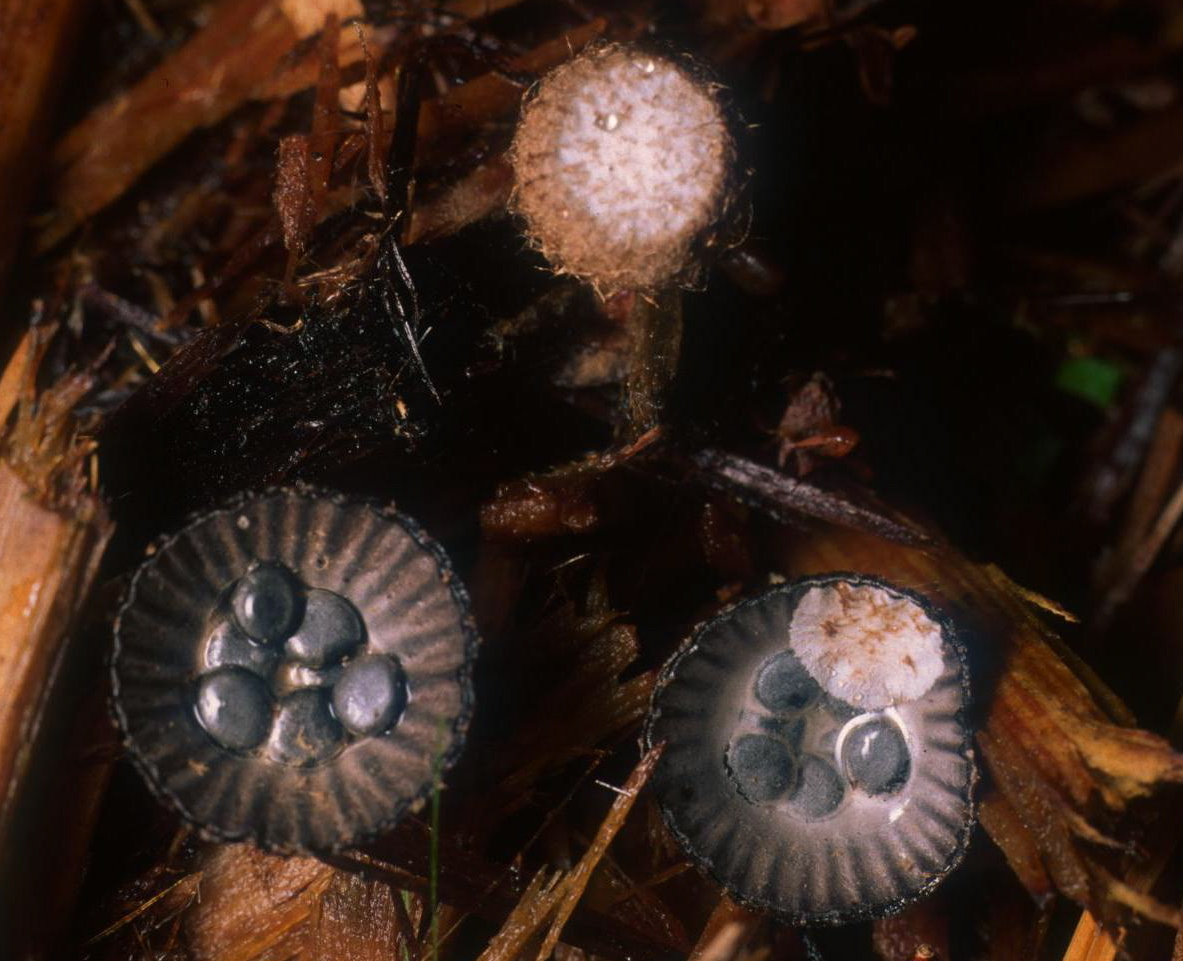
Cyathus poeppigii

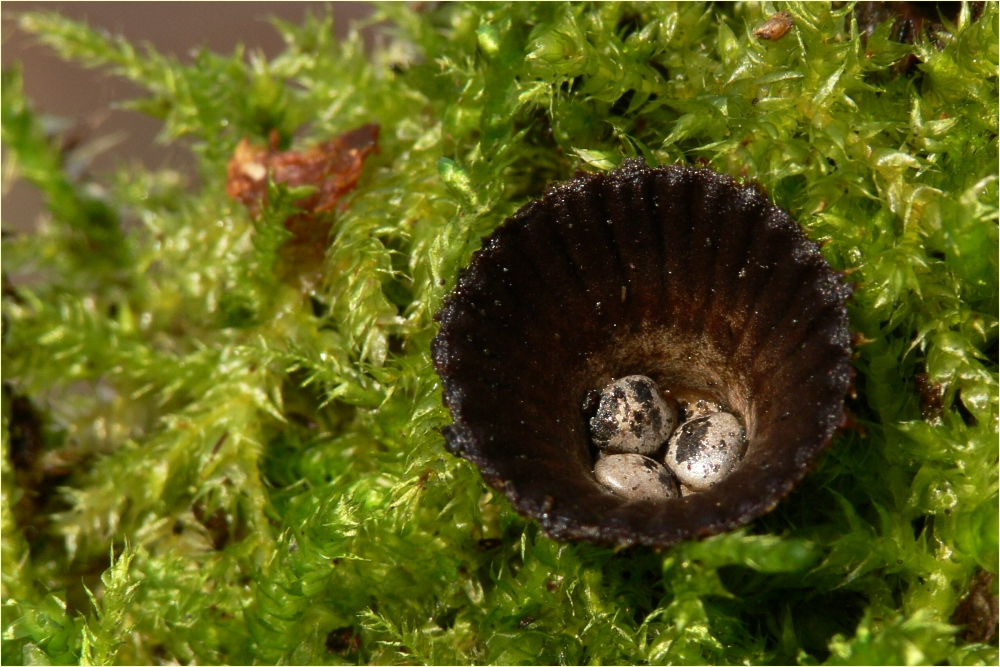
Cyathus stercoreus

| Species authority | Distribution | Dimensions (mm tall × mm wide) | Characteristics | Spore size (μm) shape |
| Etymology | Distribution | Dimensions (mm tall × mm wide) | Characteristics | Spore size (μm) shape |
|---|---|---|---|---|
| C. africanus H.J. Brodie (1967) | Mount Kilimanjaro (Tanzania) | 4–6 × 6–8 | experidium not plicate, woolly, hairs of equal length knotted into tight curls; endoperidium smooth with faint or irregular ridges; peridioles 2–2.5 mm in diameter, silvery with tunica | 6.5–8.5 × 8.5–12 ovoid, with a distinct apiculus |
| L. African | Mount Kilimanjaro (Tanzania) | 4–6 × 6–8 | experidium not plicate, woolly, hairs of equal length knotted into tight curls; endoperidium smooth with faint or irregular ridges; peridioles 2–2.5 mm in diameter, silvery with tunica | 6.5–8.5 × 8.5–12 ovoid, with a distinct apiculus |
| C. amazonicus Trierveiler-pereira & Baseia (2009) | Brazil | 9–11 × 5–7 | experidium finely plicate, woolly, hairs yellowish brown; endoperidium distinctly plicate; peridioles 2–3 × 1.2–2 mm, dark gray and shiny | 14–19 × 12–16 subglobose |
| L. Amazon | Brazil | 9–11 × 5–7 | experidium finely plicate, woolly, hairs yellowish brown; endoperidium distinctly plicate; peridioles 2–3 × 1.2–2 mm, dark gray and shiny | 14–19 × 12–16 subglobose |
| C. annulatus H.J. Brodie (1970) | Cypress Hills (Canada) | 7–10 × 7–12 | pale brown, covered on exoperidium with tomentum; basal emplacement small and inconspicuous; endoperidium pale buff, shiny, lightly striate; lip of peridium with deep brown ring 0.5 mm wide; peridioles 1.5–1.75 mm, roughly triangular with shiny tunica | 15.5–17 × 15–19 ellipsoid to ovate or roughly spherical |
| C. badius Kobayasi (1937) | Japan | 8–10 × 6–8 | Exoperidium dark brown, fruiting bodies arising from wooly base 3–mm in diameter; peridioles lenticular, 2.3 mm long by 2 mm wide by 0.6–0.9 mm thick, silvery-lead colored, with tunica. | 15–18 × 11–13 |
| L. badius (dull brown) | Japan | 8–10 × 6–8 | Exoperidium dark brown, fruiting bodies arising from wooly base 3–mm in diameter; peridioles lenticular, 2.3 mm long by 2 mm wide by 0.6–0.9 mm thick, silvery-lead colored, with tunica. | 15–18 × 11–13 |
| C. berkeleyanus (Tul. & C. Tul.) Lloyd (1906) | Widespread distribution in the tropics: West Indies, Florida, Mexico, Bolivia, Brazil, Hawaiian Islands | 6–8 × 4–6 | Exoperidium hairy in fresh specimens, but wears off in age, leaving surface smooth and plicate; inner surface variably plicate; peridioles dark brown, 1.5–3 mm in diameter; typically elliptical, with a thin tunica. | 6–9 × 4–7 |
| C. bulleri H.J. Brodie (1967) | West Indies, Hawaiian Islands, Mexico | 5–9 × 5–8 | Exoperidium with fine tomentum and long, converging downward-pointing hairs, plicate in upper third; ectoperidal surface plicate, silvery; epiphragm white with vertical tufts of hyphae; peridioles 2–2.5 mm in diameter with thick tunica, silvery when fresh, dark-brown when old. | 5–8.5 spherical |
| C. canna Lloyd (1906) | Tropical locales: Jamaica, Costa Rica, Barbados, Mexico, Mauritius | 7–8 × 6–8 | Exoperidium dark brown, scabrous with short tomentum; endoperidial surface smooth, white; peridioles with thin tunica on upper side. | 7–9 roughly spherical |
| L. from Gr. canna (a reed) | Tropical locales: Jamaica, Costa Rica, Barbados, Mexico, Mauritius | 7–8 × 6–8 | Exoperidium dark brown, scabrous with short tomentum; endoperidial surface smooth, white; peridioles with thin tunica on upper side. | 7–9 roughly spherical |
| C. chevalieri Har. & Pat. (1909) | Oubangui | Up to 20 × 5–7 | Resembles C. striatus | 8 × 5 ovoid |
| C. colensoi Berk. (1855) | New Zealand, Australia | 6–7 × 5–6 | Cups bell-shaped, smooth with fine hairs pressed down on exoperidium; peridioles approximately 2 mm | Some ellipsoid, 10–12 × 8–10; some subglobose, 9–12 |
| W. Colenso | New Zealand, Australia | 6–7 × 5–6 | Cups bell-shaped, smooth with fine hairs pressed down on exoperidium; peridioles approximately 2 mm | Some ellipsoid, 10–12 × 8–10; some subglobose, 9–12 |
| C. confusus Tai & Hung (1948) | Yunnan (China) | 11–17 × 5–9 | Exterior surface light cinnamon colored, shaggy; interior surface light buff, smooth; tunica thick. | 7–10 × 5–6.4 elliptic or narrowly obovate |
| L. confusus (confused) | Yunnan (China) | 11–17 × 5–9 | Exterior surface light cinnamon colored, shaggy; interior surface light buff, smooth; tunica thick. | 7–10 × 5–6.4 elliptic or narrowly obovate |
| C. cornucopiodes T.X. Zhou & W. Ren (1992) | China | | | |
| C. costatus Lloyd (1936) | Puerto Rico | 2.5–3 mm diameter | Exoperidium covered with dark, strigose hairs, ribbed, plicate; peridioles small (1 mm), black. | 16–× 5– elliptical |
| L. costatus (ribbed) | Puerto Rico | 2.5–3 mm diameter | Exoperidium covered with dark, strigose hairs, ribbed, plicate; peridioles small (1 mm), black. | 16–× 5– elliptical |
| C. crassimurus H.J. Brodie (1971) | Hawaii | 5 × 6–7 | Golden colored, plicate, external hairs; radially wrinkled dark brown peridioles. Has a two-layered cortex and long narrow spores. | 17–20 × 11–12 ellipsoid, very thick-walled (2.5–4 μm) |
| L. crassus (thick) murus (wall) | Hawaii | 5 × 6–7 | Golden colored, plicate, external hairs; radially wrinkled dark brown peridioles. Has a two-layered cortex and long narrow spores. | 17–20 × 11–12 ellipsoid, very thick-walled (2.5–4 μm) |
| C. crispus H.J. Brodie (1974) | Ghana | | Golden-colored, plicate peridia covered on external surface with curls of hyphal hairs | |
| C. earlei Lloyd (1906) | Tropical or subtropical: Cuba, Puerto Rico, Mexico, Hawaii | 6–7 × 8 | Dark brown exterior, silvery (almost white) interior surface; tomentum of short hairs; peridioles up to 2 mm wide, thin tunica on upper side | 12 × 10 to 22 × 12 |
| F.S. Earle | Tropical or subtropical: Cuba, Puerto Rico, Mexico, Hawaii | 6–7 × 8 | Dark brown exterior, silvery (almost white) interior surface; tomentum of short hairs; peridioles up to 2 mm wide, thin tunica on upper side | 12 × 10 to 22 × 12 |
| C. ellipsoideus H.J. Brodie (1974) | Mysore India | | Pale colored and plicate; has peridioles and spores with an ellipsoidal outline. | |
| C. elmeri Bres. | Philippines | 7–10 × 7–9 | Peridioles ash-grey, powdery, 1.3–1.5 mm in diameter; thin tunica (100–150 μm thick). | 18–22 × 10–12 ellipsoidal |
| A.D.E. Elmer | Philippines | 7–10 × 7–9 | Peridioles ash-grey, powdery, 1.3–1.5 mm in diameter; thin tunica (100–150 μm thick). | 18–22 × 10–12 ellipsoidal |
| C. fimicola Berk. (1881) | Puerto Rico, Mexico | 2–3 × 4–5 | Pale, with strigose matted hairs; peridioles small, black, 1.5 mm | 8 × 16 |
| C. gayanus Tul. & C. Tul. (1844) | Chile, Costa Rica, Jamaica, Venezuela | 153 × 5–6 | Narrow, conic, dark brown, inner surface striate, out surface only faintly striate; peridioles black, 3 mm with thick outer wall. | 20–32 roughly spherical |
| C. Gay | Chile, Costa Rica, Jamaica, Venezuela | 153 × 5–6 | Narrow, conic, dark brown, inner surface striate, out surface only faintly striate; peridioles black, 3 mm with thick outer wall. | 20–32 roughly spherical |
| C. gracilis H.J. Brodie (1973) | Luzon (Philippines); Brazil | 4–7 × 8–10 | Peridium slender, obconic, thin-walled (0.2–0.4 mm); outer surface umber- or rust-colored and covered with conical tufts of hairs, not plicate, inner surface same color as outer or lighter; epiphragm pale buff with brown hairs; peridioles 2 mm in diameter, circular. | 20 × 10 ellipsoidal |
| L. gracilis (slender) | Luzon (Philippines); Brazil | 4–7 × 8–10 | Peridium slender, obconic, thin-walled (0.2–0.4 mm); outer surface umber- or rust-colored and covered with conical tufts of hairs, not plicate, inner surface same color as outer or lighter; epiphragm pale buff with brown hairs; peridioles 2 mm in diameter, circular. | 20 × 10 ellipsoidal |
| C. griseocarpus H.J. Brodie (1984) | | | | |
| C. helenae H.J. Brodie (1966) | Alpine and boreal, and dry areas of Idaho; Brazil | | | 15–19 × 12–14 |
| C. hirtulus B. Liu & Y.M. Li (1989) | | | | 18–25.5 × 7.5–9 |
| C. hookeri Berk. (1854) | India, New Zealand, Yunnan (China) | up to 14 × 10 | Bell-shaped | |
| J. Hooker | India, New Zealand, Yunnan (China) | up to 14 × 10 | Bell-shaped | |
| C. intermedius (Mont.) Tul. & C. Tul. (1844) | West Indies, Florida, Mexico, Venezuela, Colombia, Philippines | 8–9 × 7–8 | Pale fawn color, when young covered with tomentum organized in nodules; peridioles about 2 mm in diameter, with a thin tunica. | 10–× 16 elliptical |
| L. inter (middle) and medius (middle) | West Indies, Florida, Mexico, Venezuela, Colombia, Philippines | 8–9 × 7–8 | Pale fawn color, when young covered with tomentum organized in nodules; peridioles about 2 mm in diameter, with a thin tunica. | 10–× 16 elliptical |
| C. jiayuguanensis J. Yu, T.X. Zhou & L.Z. Zhao (2002) | | | | |
| C. julietae H.J. Brodie (1967) | Jamaica | 7–8 × 7–8 | Pale brown or yellow, obconic with straight sides, thin-walled; exoperidium not plicate, covered with very fine hairs; inside wall smooth, glossy; narrow basal emplacement; epiphragm pale brown or yellowish; peridioles black, elliptical, wrinkled on upper surface, 1.5–1.75 mm long; thin tunica, single-layered cortex. | 5–9 × 5–7 subglobose to ellipsoid, thin-walled. |
| L. from the name Juliet | Jamaica | 7–8 × 7–8 | Pale brown or yellow, obconic with straight sides, thin-walled; exoperidium not plicate, covered with very fine hairs; inside wall smooth, glossy; narrow basal emplacement; epiphragm pale brown or yellowish; peridioles black, elliptical, wrinkled on upper surface, 1.5–1.75 mm long; thin tunica, single-layered cortex. | 5–9 × 5–7 subglobose to ellipsoid, thin-walled. |
| C. lanatus (H.J. Brodie) R.L. Zhao (2007) | | | | |
| C. lijiangensis T.X. Zhou & R.L. Zhao (2004) | China | 6–9 × 3–6 | Obconic or funnel-shaped, outer surface covered by greyish-white hairs and narrow tufts, plicate externally and internally, lip not setose; peridioles 1.5–2 × 1.5–1.8 mm, depressed, mostly round or ellipsoid. | 15.5–18.5 × 11–15 |
| C. limbatus Tul. & C. Tul. (1844) | British Guiana, West Indies, China, India, Africa, South America, Hawaiian Islands, Pacific Islands | 7–10 × 6–7 | Dark brown color, inner and outer surfaces plicate; peridioles 2 mm wide or more, deep brown to black, shiny. Synonymous with C. cheliensis | 16–22 × 10–12 |
| L. limbatus (bordered, or fringed) | British Guiana, West Indies, China, India, Africa, South America, Hawaiian Islands, Pacific Islands | 7–10 × 6–7 | Dark brown color, inner and outer surfaces plicate; peridioles 2 mm wide or more, deep brown to black, shiny. Synonymous with C. cheliensis | 16–22 × 10–12 |
| C. luxiensis T.X. Zhou, J. Yu & Y. Hui Chen (2003) | China | | | |
| C. microsporus Tul. & C. Tul. (1844) | San Domingo, Cuba, Costa Rica, Jamaica, Hawaii, Florida | 5–7 × 6–8 | Obconic, exoperidium no plicate, at times hairy; endoperidium smooth or with faint ridges, but not plicate; peridioles black, about 2 mm | 5–6 × 4 |
| Gr. mikros (small) and spora (seed) | San Domingo, Cuba, Costa Rica, Jamaica, Hawaii, Florida | 5–7 × 6–8 | Obconic, exoperidium no plicate, at times hairy; endoperidium smooth or with faint ridges, but not plicate; peridioles black, about 2 mm | 5–6 × 4 |
| C. minimus Pat. | China | 4–5 × 4 | Exoperidium covered with hairs pressed-down. Interior surface smooth. Peridioles approximately 1 mm, with a thin tunica. Single-layered cortex, 50 μm thick. | 18–20 × 10–12 |
| L. minimus (smallest) | China | 4–5 × 4 | Exoperidium covered with hairs pressed-down. Interior surface smooth. Peridioles approximately 1 mm, with a thin tunica. Single-layered cortex, 50 μm thick. | 18–20 × 10–12 |
| C. montagnei Tul. & C. Tul. (1844) | Brazil, West Indies, Central America, Venezuela, Congo, Philippines, Thailand | 7–10 × 8 | dark brown, fading with age, outside hirsute, faintly plicate; inside walls widely plicate, silvery-colored Peridioles are black and shiny, with a thin tunica, cortex one-layered but may appear two-layered | 20 × 12 ellipsoid |
| for Jean P. Montagne, French mycologist | Brazil, West Indies, Central America, Venezuela, Congo, Philippines, Thailand | 7–10 × 8 | dark brown, fading with age, outside hirsute, faintly plicate; inside walls widely plicate, silvery-colored Peridioles are black and shiny, with a thin tunica, cortex one-layered but may appear two-layered | 20 × 12 ellipsoid |
| C. nigroalbus Lloyd (1906) | Samoa, Fiji | | | |
| C. novae-zeelandiae Tul. & C. Tul. (1844) | New Zealand | | | |
| C. olivaceobrunneus Tai & Hung (1948) | Yunnan (China) | 7–8 × 6 | | 16–19 × 8.6–10 ellipitic, rounded at both ends |
| L. oliva (olive) and brunneus (brown) | Yunnan (China) | 7–8 × 6 | | 16–19 × 8.6–10 ellipitic, rounded at both ends |
| C. olla (Batsch) Pers. (1801) | Common, widespread | 10–15 × 8–10 | Flared outwards towards the mouth; exoperidium grey, fine-textured; endoperidium smooth; peridioles large, up to 3.5 wide, irregularly shaped, with tunica. | 10–14 × 6–8 |
| L. olla (pot) | Common, widespread | 10–15 × 8–10 | Flared outwards towards the mouth; exoperidium grey, fine-textured; endoperidium smooth; peridioles large, up to 3.5 wide, irregularly shaped, with tunica. | 10–14 × 6–8 |
| C. pallidus Berk. & M.A. Curtis (1868) | West Indies, Mexico, South America (Brazil and Peru), United States (Georgia and Florida), Hawaiian Islands | 5–7 × 5–7 | Crucible shaped, pale buff-colored; thin and friable peridium walls; exoperidium covered with long down-ward-bent hairs; peridioles dark grey to black; 2 mm diameter; with a thin tunica. | 7.5–15 × 4–8.5; Mostly ellipsoid. |
| L. pallidus (pale-colored) | West Indies, Mexico, South America (Brazil and Peru), United States (Georgia and Florida), Hawaiian Islands | 5–7 × 5–7 | Crucible shaped, pale buff-colored; thin and friable peridium walls; exoperidium covered with long down-ward-bent hairs; peridioles dark grey to black; 2 mm diameter; with a thin tunica. | 7.5–15 × 4–8.5; Mostly ellipsoid. |
| C. pictus H.J. Brodie (1971) | Mexico | 8–9 × 5 | Outer surface with fine hairs clumped into small mounds; cinnamon brown when dry, dark brown when moist; the mouth has a distinct red-brown band (0.2–0.3 mm wide) immediately below the rim; inside wall smooth, not plicate, lead-grey; emplacement large (7 mm); peridioles situated deep in cup, black, irregular shape (1.75–2 mm wide × 2–2.5 mm long), with depression on upper side; no tunica. | 26–32 globose |
| L. picted (painted) | Mexico | 8–9 × 5 | Outer surface with fine hairs clumped into small mounds; cinnamon brown when dry, dark brown when moist; the mouth has a distinct red-brown band (0.2–0.3 mm wide) immediately below the rim; inside wall smooth, not plicate, lead-grey; emplacement large (7 mm); peridioles situated deep in cup, black, irregular shape (1.75–2 mm wide × 2–2.5 mm long), with depression on upper side; no tunica. | 26–32 globose |
| C. poeppigii Tul. & C. Tul. (1844) | Warm countries: West Indies, South America, Hawaiian Islands, Asia, Africa, China, Florida | 6–8 × 6 | Narrowly obconic, felty or shaggy, reddish brown to dark brown, almost black in age; both inner and outer surface deeply fluted or plicate; peridioles black and shiny. Synonymous with C. megasporus | 30–42 × 20–28 elliptical |
| Poeppig, the collector | Warm countries: West Indies, South America, Hawaiian Islands, Asia, Africa, China, Florida | 6–8 × 6 | Narrowly obconic, felty or shaggy, reddish brown to dark brown, almost black in age; both inner and outer surface deeply fluted or plicate; peridioles black and shiny. Synonymous with C. megasporus | 30–42 × 20–28 elliptical |
| C. pullus Tai & Hung (1948) | Yunnan China | | | |
| C. pygmaeus Lloyd (1906) | United States: Washington State, Idaho, Nevada, Oregon, California; Santiago (Chile) | 4–4.5 × 3.5–4 | Exoperidium greyish brown, smooth, with appressed hairs; peridioles about 1 mm, with thin tunica. Synonymous with C. gansuensis | 12–14 × 8–9 |
| L. pygmaeus (dwarf) | United States: Washington State, Idaho, Nevada, Oregon, California; Santiago (Chile) | 4–4.5 × 3.5–4 | Exoperidium greyish brown, smooth, with appressed hairs; peridioles about 1 mm, with thin tunica. Synonymous with C. gansuensis | 12–14 × 8–9 |
| C. renweii T.X. Zhou & R.L. Zhao (2004) | China | 8–10 × 5–6 | Obconic or cup-shaped; outer surface brownish, with yellowish to pinkish hairs and narrow tufts, strongly plicate; peridioles 2 mm diameter | 21–31 × 10.5–13.5 ellipsoid to elongate-ellipsoid |
| C. rudis Pat. (1924) | New Caledonia, Amboina | 5–10 × 5–8 | Conic; striate on inner surface, with reddish squamules on outer surface; interior surface silvery-white; peridioles black-brown with thin tunica, 1 mm wide | 9–12 × 5 elliptical |
| C. setosus H.J. Brodie (1967) | St Lucia, Trinidad, Guadelope, Jamaica, Mexico, Bolivia | 8–10 × 7–8 | Mouth of cup has stiff, dark setae 0.5–1 mm long; outside surface with fine appressed hairs and some longer tangled hairs; inside surface barely plicate, silvery; basal emplacement narrow (1.5–2 mm wide); epiphragm thin, white to pale buff; peridioles angular, black, shiny, 2.5 or more wide. | 17–24 × 10–14 |
| L. setosus (bristly or hairy) | St Lucia, Trinidad, Guadelope, Jamaica, Mexico, Bolivia | 8–10 × 7–8 | Mouth of cup has stiff, dark setae 0.5–1 mm long; outside surface with fine appressed hairs and some longer tangled hairs; inside surface barely plicate, silvery; basal emplacement narrow (1.5–2 mm wide); epiphragm thin, white to pale buff; peridioles angular, black, shiny, 2.5 or more wide. | 17–24 × 10–14 |
| C. sinensis Imazeki (1950) | Kyushu Islands (Japan) | 5–6 × 2.5–5 | Peridium with obconic shape, woolly exoperidial surface (hairs tufted), cinnamon-brown color; inner surface smooth, lead-white; peridioles grey, 1.3 mm wide, 0.5 mm thick. | 12.5–18.5 × 8.3–10.3 ellipsoid |
| L.sinensis (Chinese) | Kyushu Islands (Japan) | 5–6 × 2.5–5 | Peridium with obconic shape, woolly exoperidial surface (hairs tufted), cinnamon-brown color; inner surface smooth, lead-white; peridioles grey, 1.3 mm wide, 0.5 mm thick. | 12.5–18.5 × 8.3–10.3 ellipsoid |
| C. stercoreus (Schwein.) De Toni (1888) | Worldwide | | | |
| L. stercorarius (of dung) | Worldwide | | | |
| C. striatus (Huds.) Willd. (1787) | Widespread in temperate regions; Europe, America, India, Japan, China, Mexico | | | 18–20 × 8–10 |
| C. subglobisporus R.L. Zhao, Desjardin & K.D. Hyde (2008) | Northern Thailand | | Ivory-coloured fruiting bodies covered with shaggy hairs, plications on the inner surface of the peridium and subglobose basidiospores. | |
| C. triplex Lloyd (1906) | West Indies, Florida, Venezuela, Hawaii, Philippines, Thailand | 5–6 × 5 | Outer surface smooth, covered with scabrous hairs, inner surface smooth, silvery white; peridioles 2 mm with very thin tunica. | 16–22 × 12–14 ellipsoid |
| L. triplex (threefold) | West Indies, Florida, Venezuela, Hawaii, Philippines, Thailand | 5–6 × 5 | Outer surface smooth, covered with scabrous hairs, inner surface smooth, silvery white; peridioles 2 mm with very thin tunica. | 16–22 × 12–14 ellipsoid |
| C. yunnanensis B. Liu & Y.M. Li (1989) | China | | | 14.5–22.5 × 10.5–18 |
