= T Ball =

T Ball may refer to three sports:

- Tennis
- Tee-ball or T-ball, simplified baseball
- Tetherball, hitting a ball that is suspended from a pole
