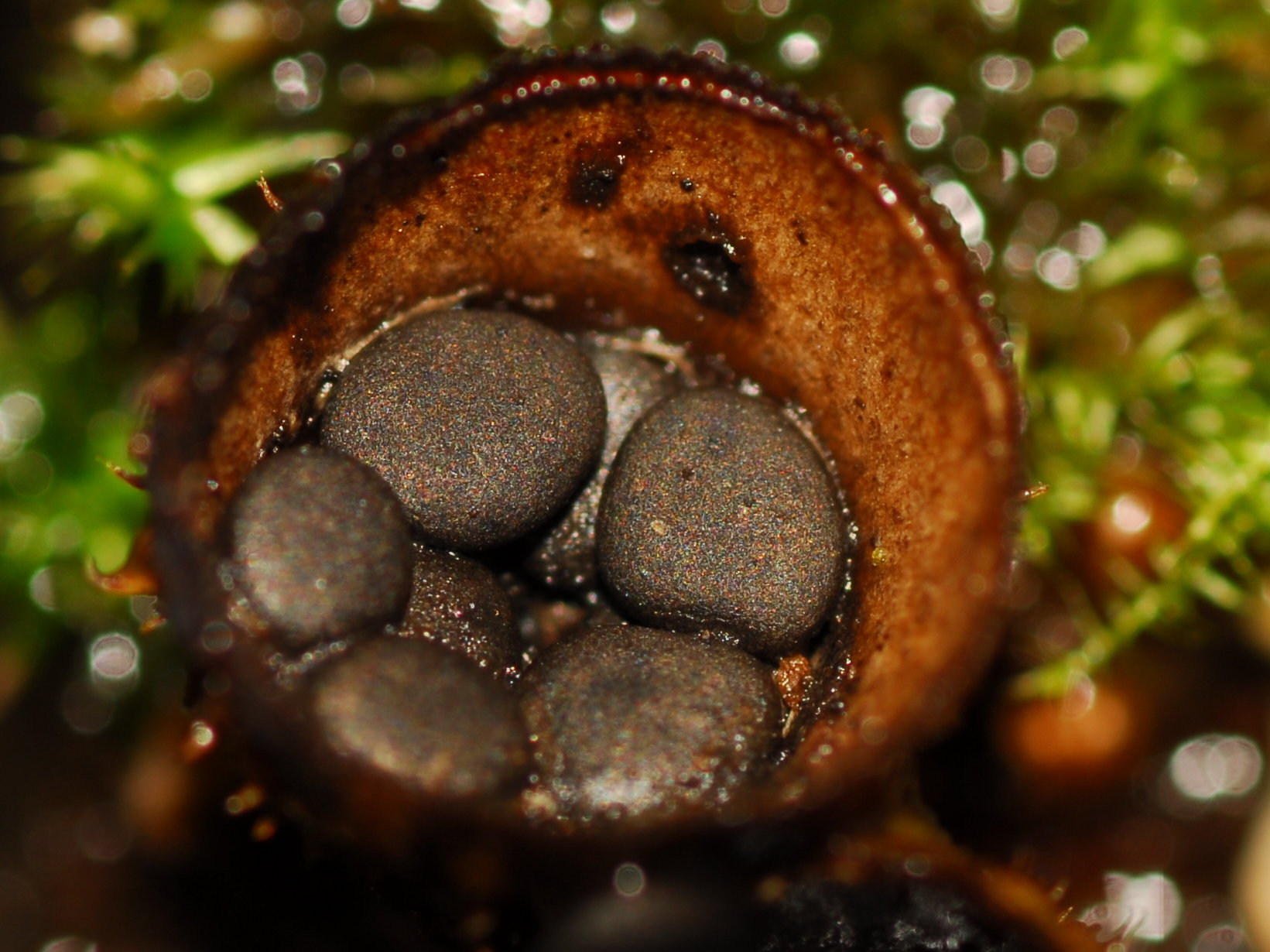

Scientific classification
- Kingdom: Fungi
- Division: Basidiomycota
- Class: Agaricomycetes
- Order: Agaricales
- Family: Nidulariaceae
- Genus: Cyathus
- Species: C. stercoreus

Binomial name
- Cyathus stercoreus (Schwein.) De Toni (1888)

Synonyms
- Several, including: Cyathus elegans Speg., 1898

= Cyathus stercoreus =

Species of fungus

Cyathus stercoreus
- Mycological characteristics
- Glebal hymenium
- No distinct cap
- Hymenium attachment is irregular or not applicable
- Lacks a stipe
- Spore print is blackish-brown to black
- Ecology is saprotrophic
- Edibility is inedible

Cyathus stercoreus, commonly known as the dung-loving bird's nest or the dung bird's nest, is a species of fungus in the genus Cyathus, family Nidulariaceae. Like other species in the Nidulariaceae, the fruiting bodies of C. stercoreus resemble tiny bird's nests filled with eggs. The fruiting bodies are referred to as splash cups, because they are developed to use the force of falling drops of water to dislodge and disperse their spores. The species has a worldwide distribution, and prefers growing on dung, or soil containing dung; the specific epithet is derived from the Latin word stercorarius, meaning "of dung".

== Description ==
The fruiting bodies, or perida, are funnel- or barrel-shaped, 6–15 mm tall, 4–8 mm wide at the mouth, sometimes short-stalked, golden brown to blackish brown in age. The outside wall of the peridium, the ectoperidium, is covered with tufts of fungal hyphae that resembles shaggy, untidy hair. However, in older specimens this outer layer of hair (technically a tomentum) may be completely worn off. The internal wall of the cup, the endoperidium, is smooth and grey to bluish-black. The 'eggs' of the bird's nest – the peridioles – are blackish, 1–2 mm in diameter, and there are typically about 20 in the cup. Peridioles are often attached to the fruiting body by a funiculus, a structure of hyphae that is differentiated into three regions: the basal piece, which attaches it to the inner wall of the peridium, the middle piece, and an upper sheath, called the purse, connected to the lower surface of the peridiole. In the purse and middle piece is a coiled thread of interwoven hyphae called the funicular cord, attached at one end to the peridiole and at the other end to an entangled mass of hyphae called the hapteron. However, Brodie reports that sometimes C. stercoreus is found without a funiculus, which has led some authors to misidentify this species with the genus Nidula.

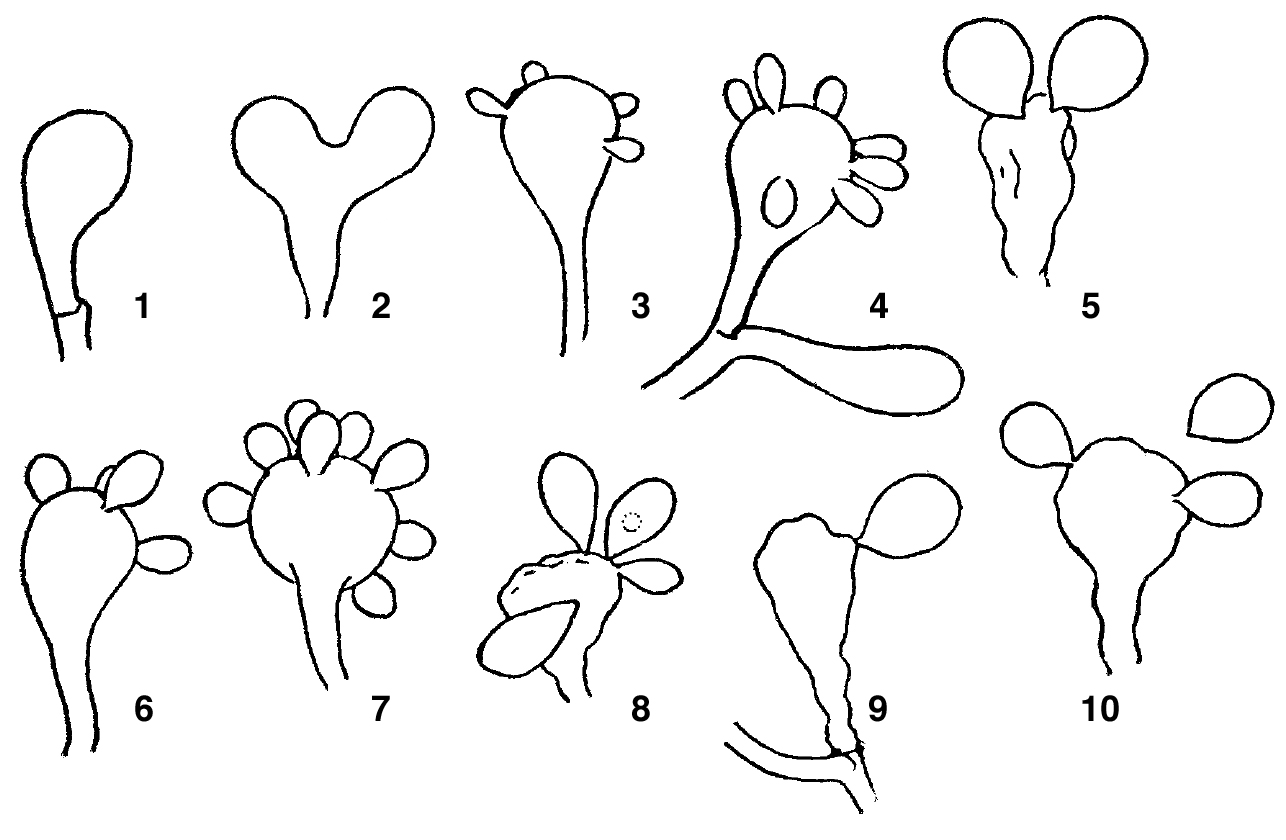
The basidia of C. stercoreus during various stages of development. (1) young basidia of usual form; (2) a double basidium; (3–6) basidia with 4 to 8 developing spores; (7–9) basidia collapsing, with spores still attached; (10) a collapsing basidium with two spores still attached, and one separated.

The spores of C. stercoreus are roughly spherical and relatively large, with typical dimensions of 20–35 × 20–25 μm, although great variability in spore size has been noted. The spores are sessile (growing directly from the surface of the basidium, without attachment via a sterigmata), and are separated from the basidia after it collapses and gelatinizes. This is accompanied by the gelatinization of the inner walls of the peridiole.

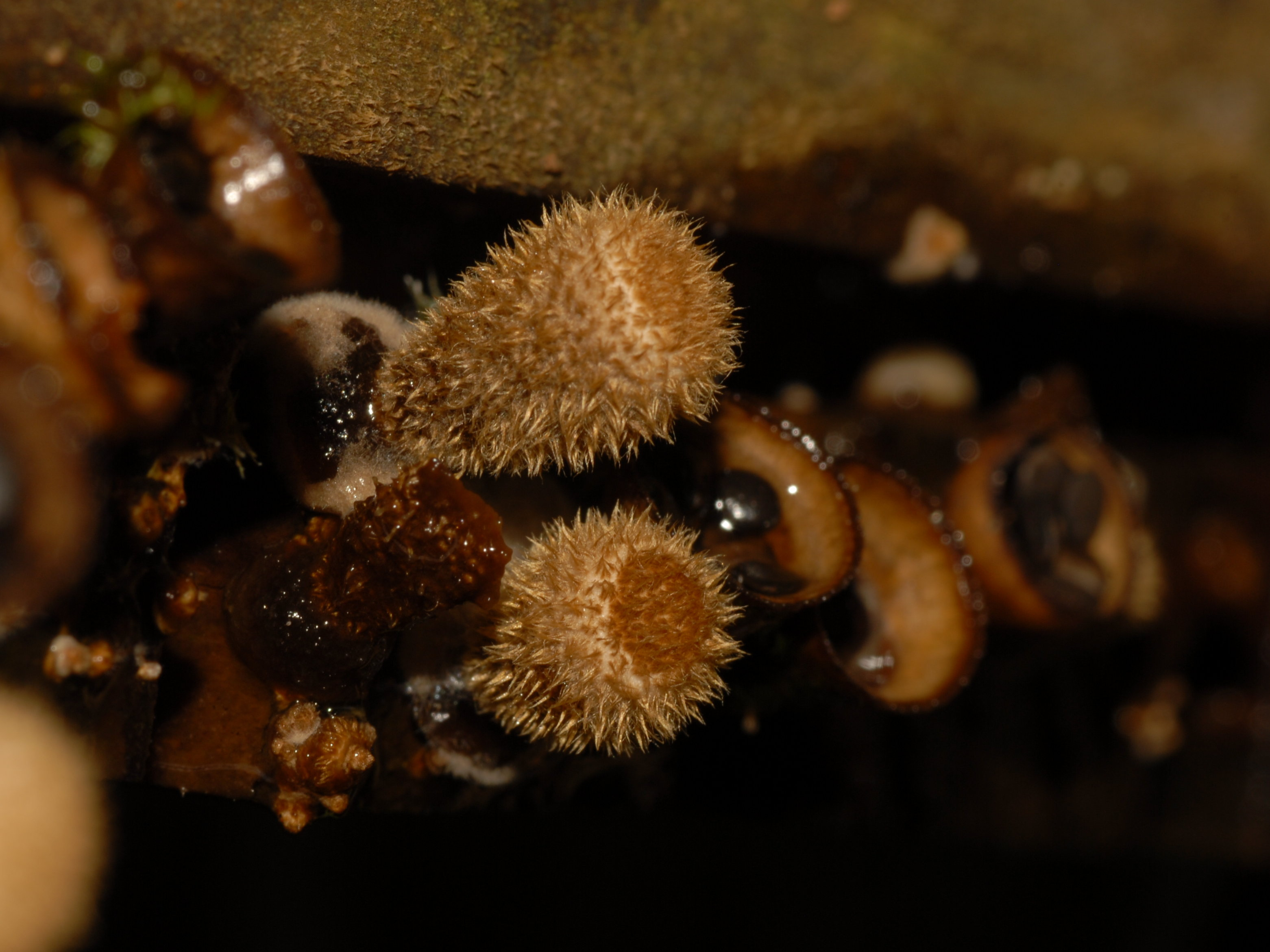
Two young specimens of C. stercoreus with intact epiphragms

=== Ultrastructure ===
Examination of fruiting bodies using scanning electron microscopy and transmission electron microscopy has revealed details about their ultrastructure—their microscopic architecture and arrangement. For example, the hyphae of the hapteron form a dense tangled network, while the hyphae of the funicular cord are arranged in a twisted form like a rope. Further, the funicular cord, known to be highly elastic and with a high tensile strength, is made of thicker hyphae than the rest of the funiculus. Also, the ecto- and endoperidium are made of thick-walled, unbranched hyphae, known as skeletal hyphae. It has been proposed that these skeletal hyphae form a structural network that helps the fruiting body maintain the elasticity vital for proper functioning of the spore dispersal mechanism.

=== Development ===
Extreme variability in fruiting body form and color has been noted for C. stercoreus. Brodie reported discovering a slender-stemmed "twinned" form, with two fruiting bodies originating from the same stalk. As has been shown in laboratory-grown specimens, the development and form of the fruiting bodies is at least partially dependent on the intensity of light it receives during development. For example, exposure of the heterokaryotic mycelium to light is required for fruiting to occur, and furthermore, this light needs to be at a wavelength of less than 530 nm. Lu suggests that certain growing conditions – such as a shortage in available nutrients – shifts the fungus' metabolism to produce a hypothetical "photoreceptive precursor" that enables the growth of the fruiting bodies to be stimulated and affected by light. The fungi is also positively phototrophic, that is, it will orient its fruiting bodies in the direction of the light source.

=== Life cycle ===
The life cycle of C. stercoreus, which contains both haploid and diploid stages, is typical of taxa in the basidiomycetes that can reproduce both asexually (via vegetative spores), or sexually (with meiosis). Basidiospores produced in the peridioles each contain a single haploid nucleus. After dispersal, the spores germinate and grow into homokaryotic hyphae, with a single nucleus in each compartment. When two homokaryotic hyphae of different mating compatibility groups fuse with one another, they form a dikaryotic (containing two nuclei) mycelia in a process called plasmogamy. After a period of time (approximately 40 days when grown from pure culture in the laboratory) and under the appropriate environmental conditions, fruiting bodies may be formed from the dikaryotic mycelia. These fruiting bodies produce peridioles containing the basidia upon which new basidiospores are made. Young basidia contain a pair of haploid sexually compatible nuclei which fuse, and the resulting diploid fusion nucleus undergoes meiosis to produce haploid basidiospores.

== Habitat and distribution ==
Being coprophilous, C. stercoreus grows on dung, in soil with dung, and bonfire sites; it has also been recorded growing on sand dunes. The fungus is known to have a worldwide distribution, and Curtis Gates Lloyd, in his monograph on the Nidulariaceae, wrote that it "probably occurs in every country where manure occurs".

== Spore dispersal ==
When a drop of water hits the interior of the cup at the appropriate angle and velocity, the peridioles are ejected into the air by the force of the drop. The force of ejection tears open the purse, and results in the expansion of the funicular cord, formerly coiled under pressure in the lower part of the purse. The peridioles, followed by the highly adhesive funicular cord and basal hapteron, may hit a nearby plant stem or stick. The hapteron sticks to it, and the funicular cord wraps around the stem or stick powered by the force of the still-moving peridiole. After drying out, the peridiole remains attached to the vegetation, where it may be eaten by a grazing herbivorous animal, and later deposited in that animal's dung to continue the life cycle.

== Uses ==
While inedible, the species has other uses.

=== Traditional medicine ===
In Traditional Chinese medicine, a decoction of this fungus is used to help relieve the symptoms of gastralgia, or stomach ache.

=== Agricultural and industrial ===
Cyathus stercoreus has been investigated for its ability to break down lignin and cellulose in agricultural byproducts, like wheat straw or grasses. It selectively breaks down lignin, leaving much of the cellulose intact, which increases the amount of digestible carbohydrate for ruminant mammals, and enhances both its value as a food source and its biodegradability. The enzymes responsible, laccase and manganese peroxidase, also have industrial applications for lignin degradation and removal in the pulp and paper industry. Liquid cultures of C. stercoreus have also been shown to biodegrade the explosive compound 2,4,6-trinitrotoluene (TNT).

== Bioactive compounds ==
General structure of cyathuscavins

A number of polyketide-type antioxidative compounds, cyathusals A, B, and C, and pulvinatal have been isolated and identified from the liquid culture of Cyathus stercoreus. Furthermore, the polyketides known as cyathuscavin A, B, and C (isolated from liquid culture) also have antioxidant activity, and have DNA protection activity.

== See also ==
- List of Cyathus species
