= Cyathus gayanus =

Scientific classification
- Domain: Eukaryota
- Kingdom: Fungi
- Division: Basidiomycota
- Class: Agaricomycetes
- Order: Agaricales
- Family: Nidulariaceae
- Genus: Cyathus
- Species: C. gayanus

Binomial name
- Cyathus gayanus (C.Tul.) Tul. (1844)

Synonyms
- Cyathodes gayanum Tul. & C.Tul. (1891)

Species of fungus

Cyathus gayanus is a species of fungus belonging to the genus Cyathus. It was first documented in 1844 by French mycologists Charles Tulasne and Louis René Tulasne. It has been documented in Chile, Costa Rica, Jamaica, and Venezuela.
