= Tetherball =

Outdoor game using tethered volleyball

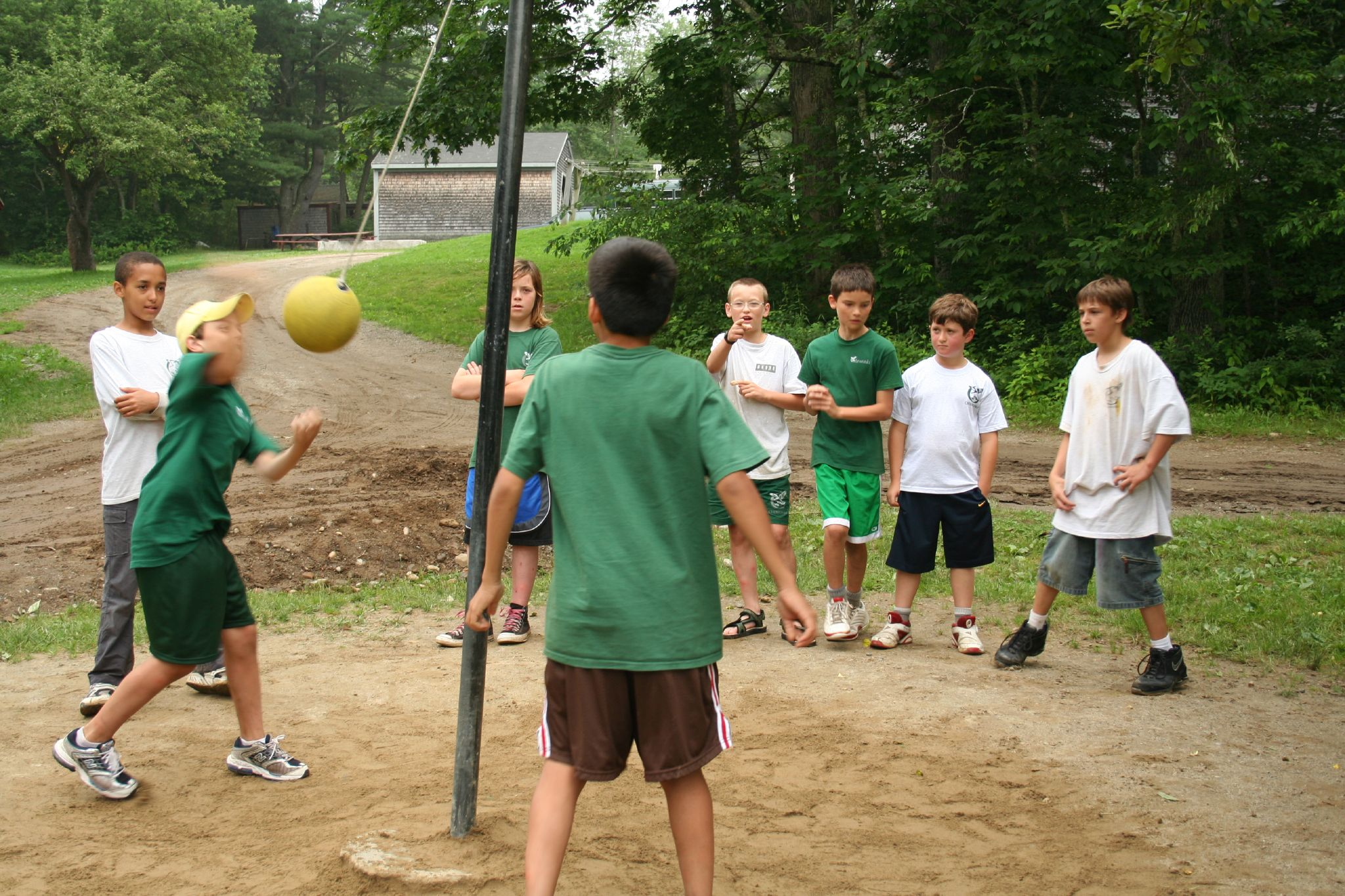
A game of tetherball

Tetherball is a game where two players use their hands to strike a volleyball which is suspended from a stationary metal pole by a rope or tether. The two players stand on opposite sides of the pole, and each tries to hit the ball one way; one clockwise, and one counterclockwise. The game ends when one player manages to wind the ball all the way around the pole so that it is stopped by the rope. It must not bounce.

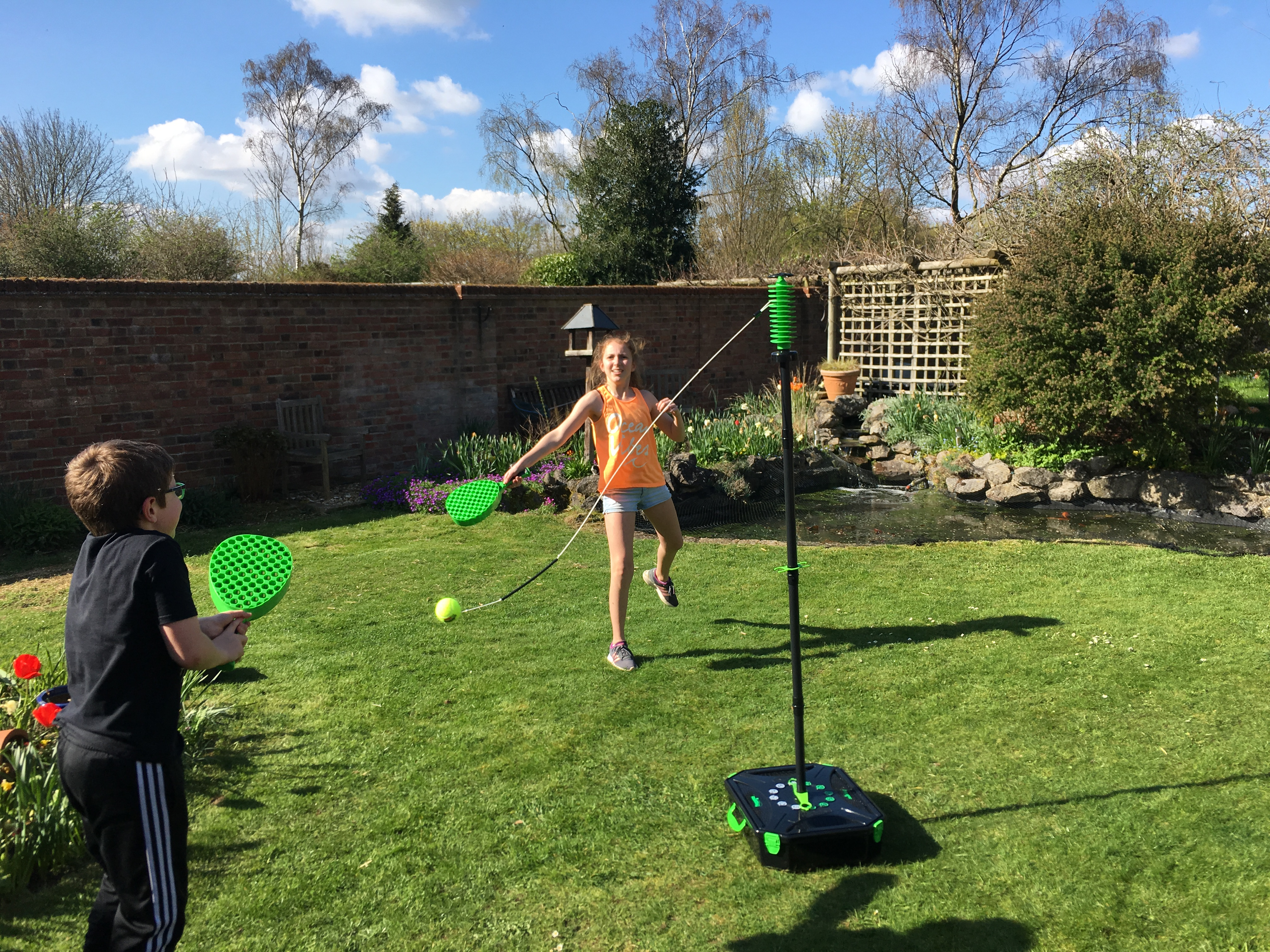
Swingball with the use of racquets

An early variant described in Jessie H. Bancroft's 1909 book Games for the Playground involves a tethered tennis ball hit by racquets, with similar rules of the game. This variant is known as swingball, which was invented by Gavin Gormely in South Africa. The variation of the game with the volleyball, known as tetherball now, did not come about until the invention of the volleyball sometime after 1895. In the 1920s, schools and parks began adding them to their play area.

The game begins when one player serves the ball, usually by holding it in one hand and hitting it with the other. The opposing player then attempts to return the serve by hitting it in the opposite direction. The object is to hit the ball in such a way that one's opponent will be unable to alter the ball's direction. This gives the server an advantage since the server has more control over the ball from the beginning. It is generally acceptable to hit the ball with either the fist or the open hand or swing.

A player commits a violation if they step onto their opponent's half of the pole, by touching the rope instead of the ball, hitting the ball before it has either circled the pole or been returned by the opponent or, in some variants, struck the pole. Generally, after a violation occurs, the game pauses and the person who committed the violation is out; the number of wraps around the pole is re-created (or a penalty-wrap is awarded to the player who did not commit the foul). The player who did not commit the violation then serves the ball. If, however, the violation appears to be intentional, it may result in loss of game. One variation legalizes throws and double hits.

The game ends when one player hits the ball around the pole in their own direction as far as it will go, so that the ball hits the pole. In addition, the ball must strike the pole with the final wrap above a line marked on the pole. A 5-foot-high (1.5 m) mark is satisfactory, though a lower mark might be used for younger players. A match can go on for at least two or more games. If a player breaks any of these rules, they are out and it is the next person's turn to play the winner. If played with only two people, the "loser" now gets their turn to serve to even out the odds for their win.

== Equipment ==
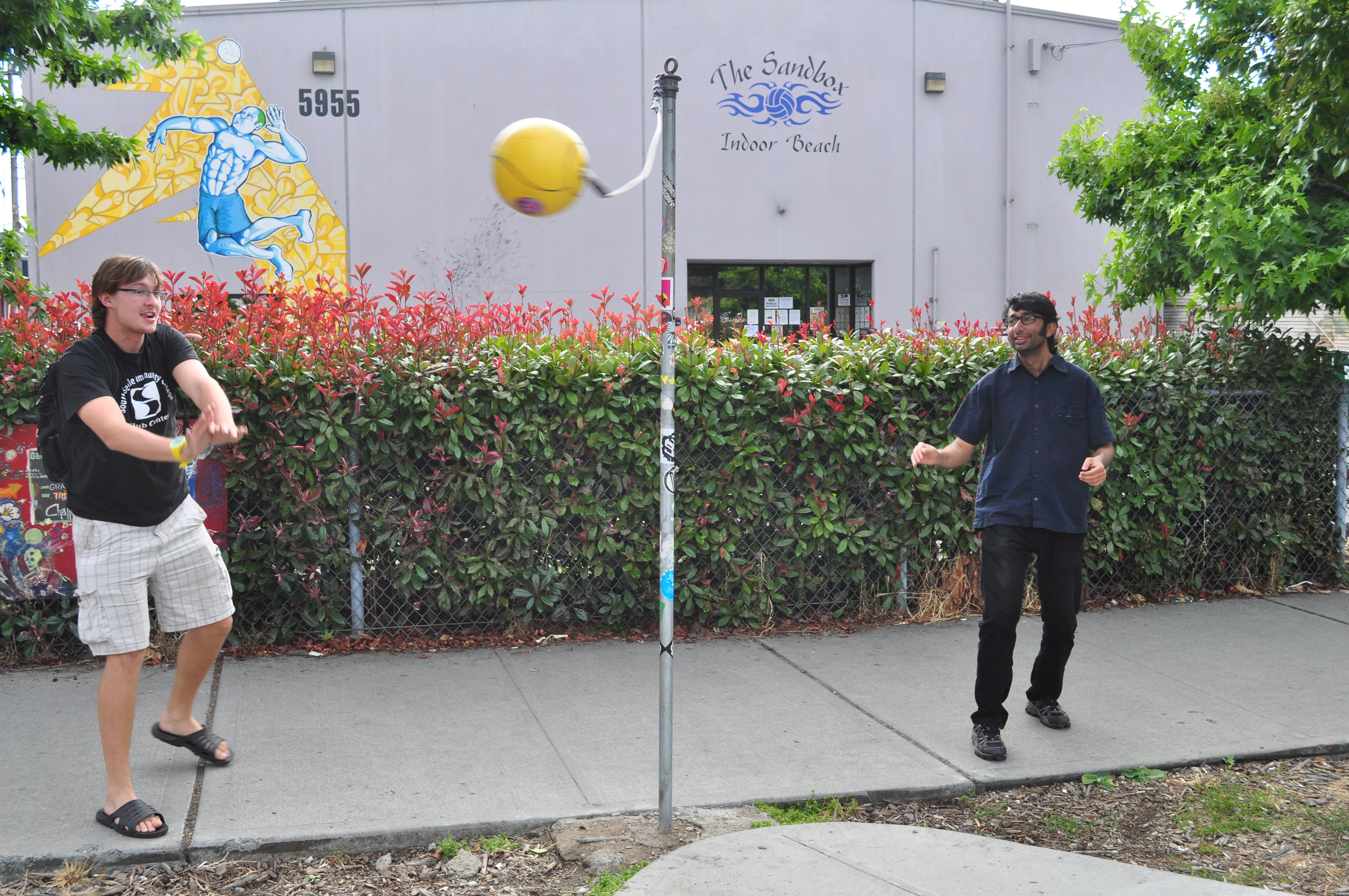
Tetherball installed for public use on a street corner in the Georgetown neighborhood of Seattle, Washington, 2013

Tetherball requires a stationary pole, a rope, and a ball. The ball is roughly the size and weight of a volleyball, but is somewhat firmer unless a soft tetherball is specifically purchased. Tetherballs usually have a bar recessed in the top that the rope is tied to. Some simply have loops that protrude out, but this is less common as striking the loop with the hand can be painful.

The pole is often 10 feet (3.0 m) high, and can be as low as 7 feet (2.1 m) high depending upon the height of the players. To keep the pole stationary, it is either anchored down by using a concrete-filled tire or a blow molded plastic base filled with sand or water or in some cases concrete, or is embedded in the ground. The rope is generally slender nylon, and is long enough so that the ball hangs about 2 feet (0.61 m) above the ground. The rope is generally 8 feet to 10 feet long.

Tetherball is played on many surfaces, including sand, gravel, lawn, and asphalt. It is common particularly in schoolyards due to the ease of setting up, and the long-lasting equipment- unlike other ball games where the ball can be destroyed or lost.
