= Plasmogamy =

Stage in sexual fungal reproduction

Plasmogamy is a stage of sexual reproduction (most frequently seen in fungi), where the protoplasm of two parent cells (usually from the mycelia) fuse without the fusion of nuclei, effectively bringing two different, haploid nuclei, close together in the same cell. This state is followed by karyogamy, where the two nuclei fuse and then undergo meiosis to produce spores. The dikaryotic state that comes after plasmogamy will often persist for many generations before the fungi undergoes karyogamy. In lower fungi however, plasmogamy is usually immediately followed by karyogamy.

Plasmogamy can also occur in protists such as Amoebozoa (Myxomycetes), and is suspected to be involved in the sexual reproduction of Leishmania . It has also been seen to occur in flowering plants as the gametes fuse to generate a zygote.

A comparative genomic study indicated the presence of the machinery for plasmogamy, karyogamy and meiosis in the Amoebozoa.

== History ==
The fusion of the protoplasms of two cells, without the nuclei fusing, appears to be first described by the mycologist John R. Raper, in his book, Genetics of Sexuality in Higher Fungi, in 1966. Through the analysis of Schizophyllum commune, he identified that the mycelia of two fungal species growing together can result in their fusion upon "hyphal contact", whether or not the strains of the fungi were compatible. This resulted in the fusion of the cells in contact, whilst their two nuclei remained separate.
