= Localized pustular psoriasis =

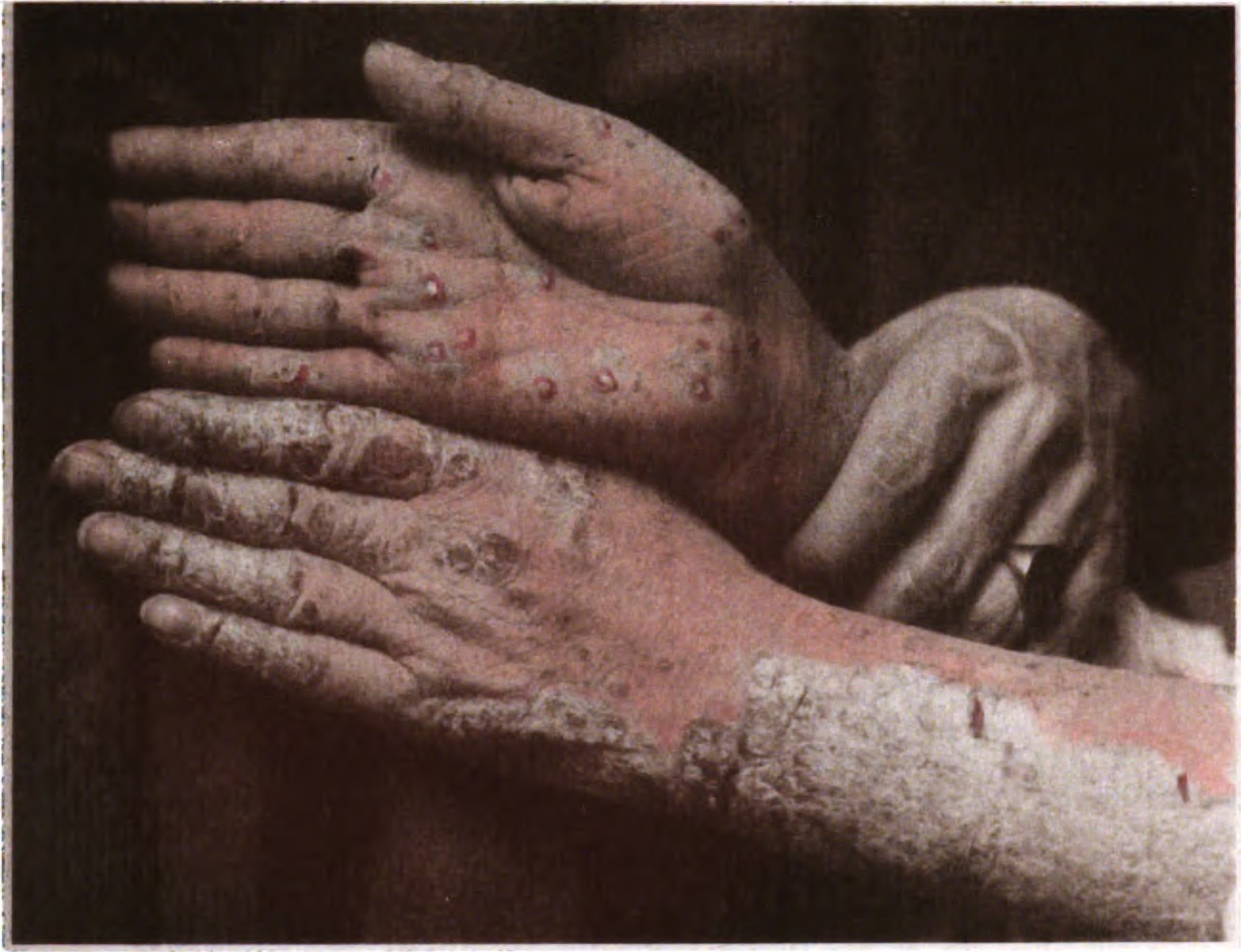
- An example of severe localized pustular psoriasis.
- Specialty: Dermatology

Localized pustular psoriasis presents as two distinct conditions that must be considered separate from generalized psoriasis, and without systemic symptoms, these two distinct varieties being pustulosis palmaris et plantaris and acrodermatitis continua.

== See also ==
- Psoriasis
- Skin lesion
