= Light-emitting diode therapy =

Clinical treatment of skin conditions

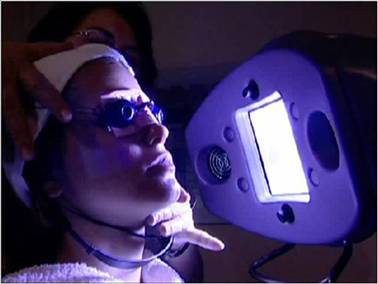
Light-emitting diode therapy (LEDT) is a therapeutic approach using different wavelengths of LED lights to treat disease. (The diagram is a blue light therapy, 415 nm wavelength)

Light-emitting diode therapy (LEDT) is a clinical approach that applies different wavelengths of light to cure diseases or conditions with skin-safe lights. Following NASA's innovation in the 1990s with Light Emitting Diodes (LEDs) that emit a specific narrow light spectrum, LED Therapy (LEDT) showed significant potential. The high precision of narrow-band LED therapy enabled its first use in clinical practices. The commonly used lights in LEDT are blue, red, green, yellow, and infrared (IR). LEDT's general mechanism is related to cellular receptor metabolism. Light functions as an external stimulus and influences cellular metabolism by initiating photo-biochemical reactions within cells. Light Emitting Diode Therapy (LEDT) encompasses two primary therapeutic approaches: photodynamic Therapy (PDT) and photobiomodulation Therapy (PBMT). Photodynamic therapy (PDT) utilises light-sensitive compounds combined with LED light to generate reactive oxygen species, which selectively target and destroy abnormal cells. Oncology and certain skin conditions widely use this technique. Whereas photobiomodulation therapy (PBMT) utilizes low-level LED light to stimulate cellular repair, stimulate wound healing, and reduce inflammation, without the use of photosensitizing agents.

Different wavelengths and mechanisms are utilized for different therapeutic effects. The therapeutic advantages of LED therapy stem from its effectiveness in various treatments, including wound healing, acne treatment, sunburn protection, and the use of phototherapy for facial wrinkles and skin revitalization.

Compared to laser phototherapy, Light Emitting Diode Therapy (LEDT) is recognized for its enhanced safety profile, exhibiting fewer short-term and long-term side effects. This distinction stems from LEDT's use of non-coherent light at lower intensities, which minimizes the risks of tissue damage and discomfort often associated with the high-intensity, coherent light of lasers. Still, there are some side effects that can be commonly seen after exposure to light, that vary on the therapy patients take, PBMT or PDT.

== History ==
The history of light therapy can be traced back to ancient Egypt and India, where therapy with natural sunlight was first used to treat leucoderma. In the 1850s, Florence Nightingale's advocacy of exposure to clean air and sunlight for health restoration also contributed to the initial development of light therapy for treatments. Later, Downes and Blunt's experiment in 1877 suggested sunlight's effect on fungal growth inhibition, which further evidenced the efficiency of light therapy .

The modern use of light therapy with artificial lights started in the late 19th century. The Danish Nobel Prize winner in medicine and physiology, Niels Finsen, pioneered the use of light as a therapy for skin tuberculosis (lupus vulgaris). His creation of the light device "Finsen lamp" as a lupus vulgaris treatment marked the beginning of modern light therapy. The application of LED lights in cosmetology became more popular in the 1980s, particularly for acne recovery, due to its ability of collagen production. Since the early 2000s, the use of LED light therapy in the medical field has become more versatile, including treatment for skin conditions, chronic diseases, and the realignment of human circadian rhythm. It has now become a commonly used therapy in both the beauty and medical fields.

== Mechanisms ==
LEDs are the most utilized optical semiconductor devices that transform electrical energy into light energy. LED therapy utilizes light-emitting diodes to deliver treatments based on mechanisms such as photodynamic Therapy (PDT) and photobiomodulation (PBMT). PDT targets and destroys diseased cells, while PBMT stimulates cellular repair and reduces inflammation. The effectiveness of LED therapy varies with the wavelength of light, allowing for diverse applications in healing, dermatology, and cancer treatment.

=== Photodynamic (PDT) mechanism ===
PDT can induce many cellular pathways, and its main purpose is to induce cell death, either by apoptosis or necrosis. The fundamental process of photodynamic reactions involves three elements: photosensitizers (PS), light of a specific wavelength, and oxygen present in the cell. The interaction of these three components produced a desirable effect inside targeted tissues. Apart from light and oxygen, photosensitizers are compounds designed to absorb light at particular wavelengths during therapy, which enables them to initiate therapeutic processes.

Two pathway branches interact and contribute to different ratios during PDT therapy, affecting its efficiency. Both mechanisms have the same first stage. When cells absorb photosensitizers and are exposed to light that aligns with their absorption spectrum, these substances photo-excite from their stable ground state (S°) to an energised excited singlet state (S^{1}). Some energy is emitted as fluorescence, remaining energy directs the photosensitizer molecule into triplet state T^{1}.

Type I pathway of photodynamic reaction: T^{1} state PS can then interact with nearby molecules. Energy transfers between the photosensitizer and other molecules in the form of hydrogen and electrons, resulting in the creation of free radicals and anion radicals. These radicals remain in ground state and react with oxygen, leading to the formation of reactive oxygen species (ROS) and superoxide anion radicals (O2•−), which further react with oxygen to generate ROS. The chain of reactions that generate reactive oxygen species (ROS) results in oxidative stress, which ultimately causes cell damage.

Type II pathway of photodynamic reaction: After PS is excited into T^{1} state, the energy is transferred directly between PS and O_{2}. This interaction transforms the oxygen molecules into a highly reactive form known as singlet oxygen. Singlet oxygen possesses potent oxidizing properties, making it extremely effective in reacting with and damaging cellular components. However, this reaction is selective; while most cellular components exist in a less reactive singlet state and remain unaffected, the singlet oxygen specifically targets and reacts with oxygen molecules in the cell cytoplasm.

PDT is used to treat cancer across diverse types and sites. A unique feature of PDT is that photosensitizers tend to accumulate more selectively in cancer cells than in normal cells. The high affinity of photosensitizers to low-density lipoprotein (LDL) allows for selectivity. LDL acts as a carrier, allowing photosensitizers to travel into cancerous tissues. The interaction between photosensitizers and LDL makes it easier for therapeutic agents to reach the right places, which makes PDT more effective against cancer.

=== Photo-biomodulation therapy (PBMT) mechanism ===
Photobiomodulation therapy (PBMT) uses low-power densities and is characterized by its non-heat producing effects, a feature previously associated only with laser light. Nowadays, low-level LED lights offer a cost-effective alternative, expanding the accessibility and application of this therapeutic approach.

PBMT (low-level light) targets mitochondria and has impacts on, 1) raising ROS levels, 2) creating adenosine triphosphate (ATP); and 3) helping to turn on transcription factor. That can trigger biochemical change within the cells, involve photon emitting light absorbed by the photoreceptor and cascade reaction. When exposed to LED light, the cytochrome c oxidase (CCO) inside the electron transport chain (ETC) of mitochondria is targeted. Its two heme and two copper subunits are oxidized or reduced, enabling it to absorb light at various wavelengths. CCO is the main target of near-infrared and red(650-1000 nm) wavelengths.

Cytochrome c oxidase (CCO) is a key protein in the Electron Transport Chain, responsible for transferring electrons to the final oxygen acceptor. This action helps build a substantial proton gradient across the inter-membrane space of mitochondria; a process critical for the synthesis of ATP (Adenosine Triphosphate). The increased production of ATP because of this activity. CCO is also a photoreceptor, the photon absorption of CCO can lead to enhanced enzyme activity, increased oxygen consumption and usage of ATP production and the release of NO (nitric oxide).

The NO can then contribute to two suggested pathways. Under typical conditions, nitric oxide (NO) interacts non-covalently with the heme and copper (Cu) subunits of CCO, competing with oxygen molecules and inhibiting cellular respiration, leading to reduced production of adenosine triphosphate (ATP). Low energy light can revise the mitochondrial inhibition of cellular respiration by photodissociating of NO from CCO, and thereby increasing ATP synthesis.

The second pathway proposes that released nitric oxide (NO) will boost Cytochrome c Oxidase (CCO) activity, as an enzyme nitrite reductase. This mechanism includes the transfer of electrons to oxygen molecules, resulting in the production of water and reactive oxygen species (ROS). The ROS then activates enzymes necessary for producing vital cellular components like nucleic acids and proteins. LED therapy may also increase ROS, which may activate transcription factors that manage genes important for cell growth, cytokine production, and making growth factors for cell repair and proliferation.

=== Wavelength ===
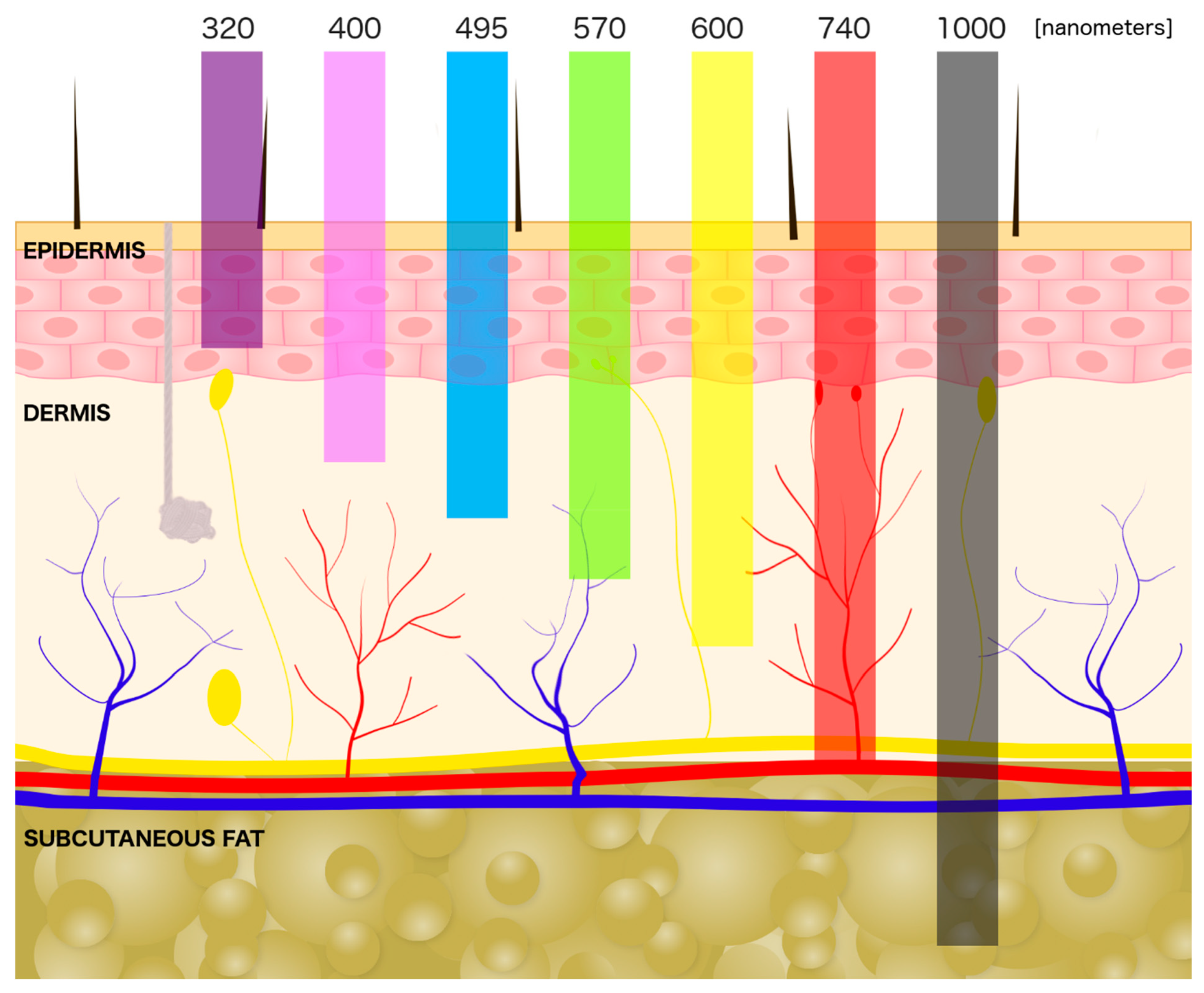
The skin cross-section showing dermal penetration by different wavelengths of light

LEDs produce wavelengths that span from UV-A (350 nm) to near-infrared (NIR) (1100 nm). The wavelength of the LED light can target different tissues. Long wavelength lights such as NIR/dark red(600-1000 nm) can have better tissue penetration and can easily absorb cytochrome c oxidase (CCO) targets by PBMT. Therefore, the long wavelength light is used for dermatology and cosmetics applications. While short wavelength light, green or blue light can be absorbed and target hemoglobin in the blood.

== Current application of LED light therapy ==
Red light therapy, utilising red LED lights, originated from techniques intended to enhance plant growth in space and aid in astronauts' wound healing. Primarily used in dermatology, it enhances skin conditions by stimulating mitochondria, thereby increasing collagen production and blood circulation while reducing inflammation. Additionally, it plays a crucial role in photodynamic therapy, where it combines with photosensitive drugs to target and destroy cancerous cells through a light-induced chemical reaction.

Blue light therapy is also a common LED light therapy to treat acne, skin cancer, and depression. While blue light therapy has similar mechanisms for skin enhancement as red light therapy, its usage for photodynamic therapies in treating cancer are slightly different. Blue light therapy stimulates immune system defences, destroys blood vessels that help cancer cells grow, and causes cell death by reacting with oxygen. It also prevents skin cancer and metastasis by removing precancerous and cancerous skin lesions.

Application of red and blue LED light for photodynamic treatments are generally safe and can be used to treat different cancers. However, they may differ in the efficiency and response. For instance, In the treatment of Gorlin syndrome, a genetic disorder predisposed to cancer, studies have shown that blue light therapy achieves a higher tumor clearance rate and induces less pain than red light therapy.

As a result of the increasing popularity of LED light therapies for skin improvements, a wide range of skincare devices utilizing this technology are readily available on the market. LED red light products are most common for domestic LED light therapy, including LED light masks, panels, handheld devices, and belts. Typically, individuals buy these items to address issues like wrinkles and acne, reduce puffiness, and promote hair growth.

== Therapeutic effects ==
=== Skin inflammatory condition ===
==== Acne vulgaris ====
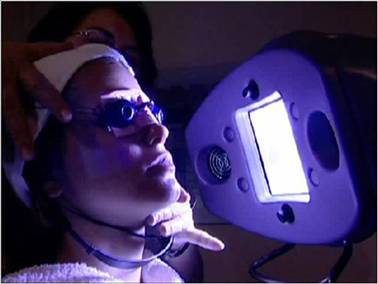
Blue-light LEDT (at a wavelength of 415nm) is used to treat acne by reducing sebum secretion

Acne vulgaris is a common chronic inflammatory pilosebaceous skin disorder associated with papules, pustules, or nodules primarily on the face. The separate and combined therapeutic effects of red and blue lights LEDT proved to be effective for acne therapy.

Skin sebum plugs is the most typical cause of Acne.

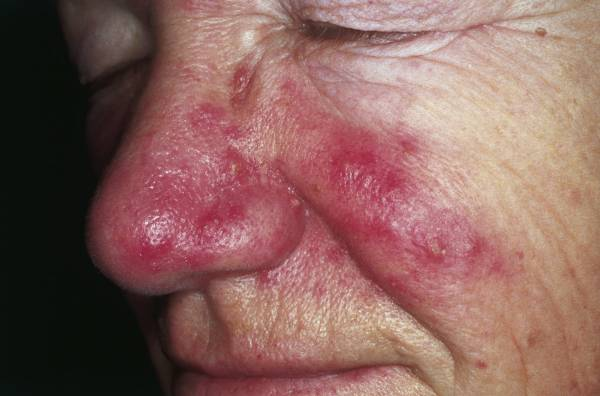
Rosacea symptoms (on the nasal side and check)

==== Rosacea ====
Rosacea is a chronic skin disorder that presents with recurrent flushing, erythema, papules, and telangiectasia. Methyl aminolevulinate (MAL) is a drug used as a photosensitizer in photodynamic therapy like LEDT. The red-light MAL-LED therapy performed significant therapeutic effects on the recovery of papulopustular lesions in an in-vivo clinical trial conducted with rosacea patients. A more recent study proves the in-vitro effect of LEDT at wavelengths of 630 nm and 940 nm in rosacea-like mouse skin.

Solar UV radiation can lead to DNA mutation with higher level of MMP expression

=== Anti-aging and rejuvenation treatment ===
Solar UV radiation accelerates the skin ageing rate and contributes to abnormal cutaneous status by increasing matrix-metalloproteinase (MMP) expression in photo-damaged skin. MMPs consist of various proteinases that degrade collagen fibrils and other components of the cutaneous extracellular matrix.

The commonly used therapies for skin ageing involve the use of retinoic acid, laser resurfacing, peels (trichloroacetic acid and CO_{2}), injectable skin rejuvenation, and dermal fillers. In comparison, LEDT is a more non-ablative cutaneous rejuvenation approach with less safety concern and higher effectiveness. LECT with yellow LED (at a wavelength of 590 nm) contributes to the skin rejuvenation effects on nearly a thousand clinical samples. Researchers conclude that the use of red-light LEDT is an efficient collagen enhancement strategy. LEDT's combination therapy of different light wavelengths also shows greater efficacy. For instance, blue-light LEDT coupled with photosensitizers reveals better elasticity, less pigmentation, and more complexion of the skin.

=== Cancerous skin lesions ===
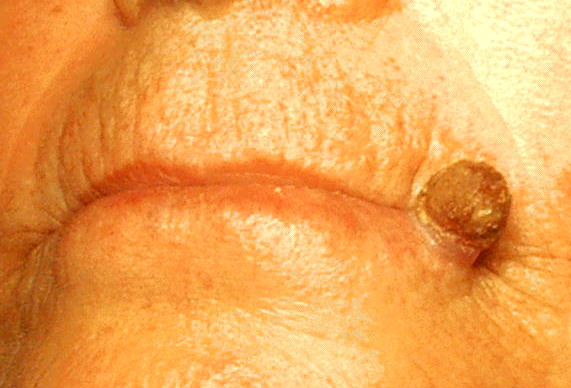
Actinic keratosis symptoms (on the lip)

The cancerous skin lesions refer to damaged cutaneous tissues with risks of further developing into skin cell carcinoma. Skin carcinoma, or skin cancer, is very common in sun-radiation-abundant areas. The over-exposure to sunlight is the most prevalent cause that leads to Actinic keratosis (AK), a common cancerous cutaneous lesion.

Photodynamic therapy (PDT) has proven to be an effective approach for AK at sites of poor healing with few responses to other therapies. In the comparison study between MAL-LEDT and typical cryotherapy, blue-light LEDT with Aminolevulinic acid (ALA) as a photosensitizer reveals significantly higher healing rates. The other clinical trial illustrates the effect of combined therapy of red-light LEDT and nano-emulsion in treating cancerous skin lesions.

=== Hair loss disorder ===
The first LLLT (low-level laser device) device (at a wavelength of 635 nm) for androgenetic alopecia was approved by the FDA two decades ago. The FDA then approved a similar device (at a wavelength of 655 nm) for alopecia two years later, in 2009.

Low-level laser therapy (LLLT) is the traditional FDA-approved therapy for hair loss disorders, while LEDT has become a more advanced treatment due to its safety and efficacy. The commonly used wavelengths targeting hair loss disorder are red and infrared. In-vivo studies show that the red-light LEDT at the wavelength of 655 nm contributes to dramatic improvements in the hair counts of androgenetic alopecia patients. A more recent study indicates a similar therapeutic effect of yellow-light LEDT on androgenetic alopecia and alopecia areata patients.

== Side effects ==
=== Side effects of photobiomodulation therapy ===
While Photobiomodulation (PBM) therapy is generally considered safe, there are infrequent instances of immediate adverse effects. Common side effects associated with this form of light therapy can include itching, the appearance of red spots, congestion along the deep external auditory canal wall, and mild allergic reactions. These side effects are typically transient and resolve without intervention.

=== Side effects of photodynamic therapy ===
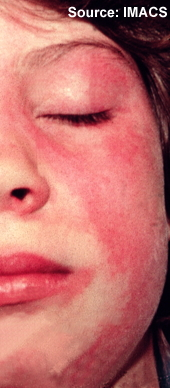
Side effects such as urticaria can happen after LED therapy

The side effects of photodynamic therapy can be divided into onset side effects, which occur which early exposure to light. Early onset side effects of photodynamic Therapy (PDT) commonly include pain and Local Skin Reactions (LSRs), such as erythema, Edema, desquamation, and pustulae. These effects are frequently observed during or shortly after exposure to the light source used in PDT and may occur in combination. Less common side effects include urticaria, contact dermatitis, and erosive pustular dermatosis of the scalp (EPDS). Additionally, PDT can have an acute impact on the immune system, which, although immediate in onset, may have long-term implications for treatment-related changes in carcinogenesis.

Late onset side effects, include pigmentary changes and scarring, affecting approximately 0.8% of patients. There is also a risk of developing bullous pemphigoid, and there is potential for PDT to induce or stimulate skin carcinogenesis.

== LED light therapy v.s laser therapy ==
In the field of phototherapy, Low-Level Laser Therapy (LLLT) and LED Therapy (LEDT) are well-known modalities that provide non-invasive treatment options for a variety of medical conditions. Low-Level Laser Therapy (LLLT) employs low-intensity lasers, occasionally supplemented by LED lighting, to address a variety of medical conditions. Similar to LED Therapy (LEDT), LLLT's applications include the treatment of skin issues such as inflammation and pigmentation, tissue damage, and cardiovascular concerns. Although both LEDT and LLLT share therapeutic goals, LEDT is particularly noted for its cost-effectiveness and is designed for broader coverage using expansive LED panels, whereas LLLT utilizes more focused, coherent laser light for targeted areas. For this reason, laser therapy is appropriate for treating tissues beneath the hypodermis, LED therapy is more effective in treating cutaneous diseases.
