= Psoriatic erythroderma =

- Other names: Erythrodermic psoriasis or Von Zumbusch Psoriasis
- Specialty: Dermatology

Psoriatic erythroderma represents a form of psoriasis that affects all body sites, including the face, hands, feet, nails, trunk, and extremities. This specific form of psoriasis affects 3 percent of persons diagnosed with psoriasis. First-line treatments for psoriatic erythroderma include immunosuppressive medications such as methotrexate, acitretin, or ciclosporin.

== Signs and symptoms ==
Psoriatic erythroderma displays generalized cutaneous symptoms, including scaling, hair loss, erythema, edema, pruritus, diffuse desquamation, and occasionally exudative lesions and palmoplantar or diffuse psoriatic plaques. Psoriatic erythroderma frequently results in changes to the nails, which can vary from minor pitting to severe onychodystrophy and typically affect the fingernails rather than the toenails. Systemic symptoms may also include fever, tachycardia, chills, exhaustion, malaise, lymphadenopathy, myalgia, arthralgia, insomnia, diarrhea, sweats, constipation, changes in weight, allodynia, and, in rare cases, high output heart failure (caused by excessive edema and water loss) and cachexia.

== Causes ==
Psoriatic erythroderma can be congenital or secondary to an environmental trigger. Environmental triggers that have been documented include sunburn, skin trauma, psychological stress, systemic illness, alcoholism, drug exposure, chemical exposure (e.g., topical tar, computed tomography contrast material), and the sudden cessation of medication. Methotrexate, efalizumab, and topical and oral steroids are common antipsoriatic drugs that can cause the rebound phenomenon. Leukemia, T-cell lymphoma, gout, and the human immunodeficiency virus are among the systemic diseases that have been linked to psoriatic erythroderma. Pharmaceutical drugs such as etretinate, acitretin, infliximab, antimalarials, lithium, and trimethoprim/sulfamethoxazole have also been documented in the literature to cause psoriatic erythroderma.

== Diagnosis ==
Many authors propose that generalized inflammatory erythema involving at least 75% of the body's surface area, with or without exfoliation, is necessary for a clinical diagnosis of psoriatic erythroderma. According to some authors, the affected area of the body must be at least 90% of its surface.

Histologic analysis of psoriatic erythroderma, which shows dilated capillaries, an epidermal perivascular infiltrate of eosinophils and lymphocytes, and hyperkeratosis, can confirm the diagnosis if clinical suspicion is high. Some characteristics of classical psoriasis, such as parakeratosis, acanthosis, Munro micro-abscesses, spongiosis, and sporadic apoptotic keratinocytes, are additional histological features of psoriatic erythroderma.

== Treatment ==
Correcting any abnormalities in fluid, protein, or electrolyte levels; evaluating nutrition; guarding against hypothermia; and treating any secondary infections are all important aspects of the initial management of psoriatic erythroderma.

The literature has documented the use of topical emollients, topical vitamin D analogs, colloidal oatmeal baths, medium potency topical steroids under occlusive dressings, and various combinations of the aforementioned.

For moderate-to-severe plaque psoriasis, phototherapy is an efficient first-line treatment that reduces inflammation by promoting keratinocyte apoptosis, suppressing keratinocyte proliferation, and reducing the activity of the Th1 and Th17 inflammatory pathways. Given the risk of koebernization, phototherapy is not recommended in cases of acute, fulminant psoriatic erythroderma. However, once the course of the disease becomes more stable, phototherapy may be useful in the long-term management of psoriatic erythroderma.

For moderate-to-severe psoriasis and other hyperkeratotic disorders, retinoids, including acitretin, are useful systemic treatments.

Dihydrofolate reductase is inhibited by the immunosuppressive medication methotrexate. For individuals with plaque psoriasis whose condition cannot be adequately controlled with topicals alone, oral systemic therapy combined with methotrexate is the first choice.

Cyclosporine is an immunosuppressive medication that inhibits the transcription of IL-2, which hinders T-cell proliferation and function. The US Food and Drug Administration has approved cyclosporine for the management of severe plaque psoriasis in immunocompetent individuals. Cyclosporine is regarded as an essential first-line medication for the management of unstable cases of psoriatic erythroderma because of its quick onset of action.

Another immune suppressant that specifically blocks activated lymphocytes is mycophenolate mofetil. A randomized controlled trial, small clinical studies, and multiple case reports have demonstrated its effectiveness as a monotherapy for moderate-to-severe psoriasis.

A new class of medications known as biologic therapy targets particular immune system cytokines. These drugs show great promise as a substitute for traditional immunosuppressants like cyclosporine and methotrexate because of their improved selectivity. A few types of biologics, such as TNF-α inhibitors, IL-12/IL-23 inhibitors, and most recently, IL-17A inhibitors, have been used to treat psoriatic erythroderma.

== See also ==
- Skin lesion
- List of cutaneous conditions
