= Inverse psoriasis =

- Specialty: Dermatology

Inverse psoriasis or flexural psoriasis is a form of psoriasis that selectively, and often exclusively, involves the folds, recesses, and flexor surfaces such as the ears, axillae, groin folds, inframammary folds, navel, intergluteal cleft, penis, and lips.

== Signs and symptoms ==
Well-defined, erythematous patches are the clinical hallmark of inverse psoriasis. The perianal area, umbilicus, axillae, inframammary folds, inguinal folds, and retroauricular areas are the areas most frequently affected. Interdigital spaces and the popliteal and antecubital fossae may also be affected. In contrast to plaque psoriasis, the lesions' surface appears wet, smooth, and shiny, and yellowish scales are usually minor or absent.

== Causes ==
Psoriasis is a cellular autoimmune reaction caused by T-cells to what are thought to be skin-resident self-antigens. The psoriasiform reaction is brought on by an increase in interferon-γ and interleukin-17, which interact with mast cells, neutrophils, macrophages, and dermal cells. There is little evidence to suggest that the pathophysiologic mechanisms underlying inverse and common psoriasis vary from one another. The amount of CD161+ cells in the inverse psoriasis plaques, however, might be diminishing. This is thought to be caused by the ongoing microbial colonization of the inverse psoriasis-affected regions.

== Diagnosis ==
The diagnosis of inverse psoriasis is typically clinical, and a physical examination should check for psoriasis in other parts of the body besides skin folds, such as mucosae.

When inverse psoriasis is the sole symptom of the illness, diagnosis might be challenging in certain situations and necessitate skin biopsies. In terms of histopathology, inverse psoriasis exhibits the typical pattern of plaque psoriasis, which includes rete ridge elongation and epidermal hyperplasia along with parakeratosis, acanthosis, suprapapillary plate thinning, granulosus layer reduction, and, in certain situations, Munro microabcesses and Kogoj micropustules. Spongiosis is more widespread and epidermal hyperplasia is less prominent than in classical plaque psoriasis.

== Treatment ==
Treatment of inverse psoriasis may include "topical corticosteroids, topical calcineurin inhibitors, vitamin D analogs, traditional oral systemic therapies such as cyclosporine and methotrexate, and biologic therapies" according to a 2019 article.

== See also ==
- Skin lesion
