= Pustular psoriasis =

Pustular Psoriasis
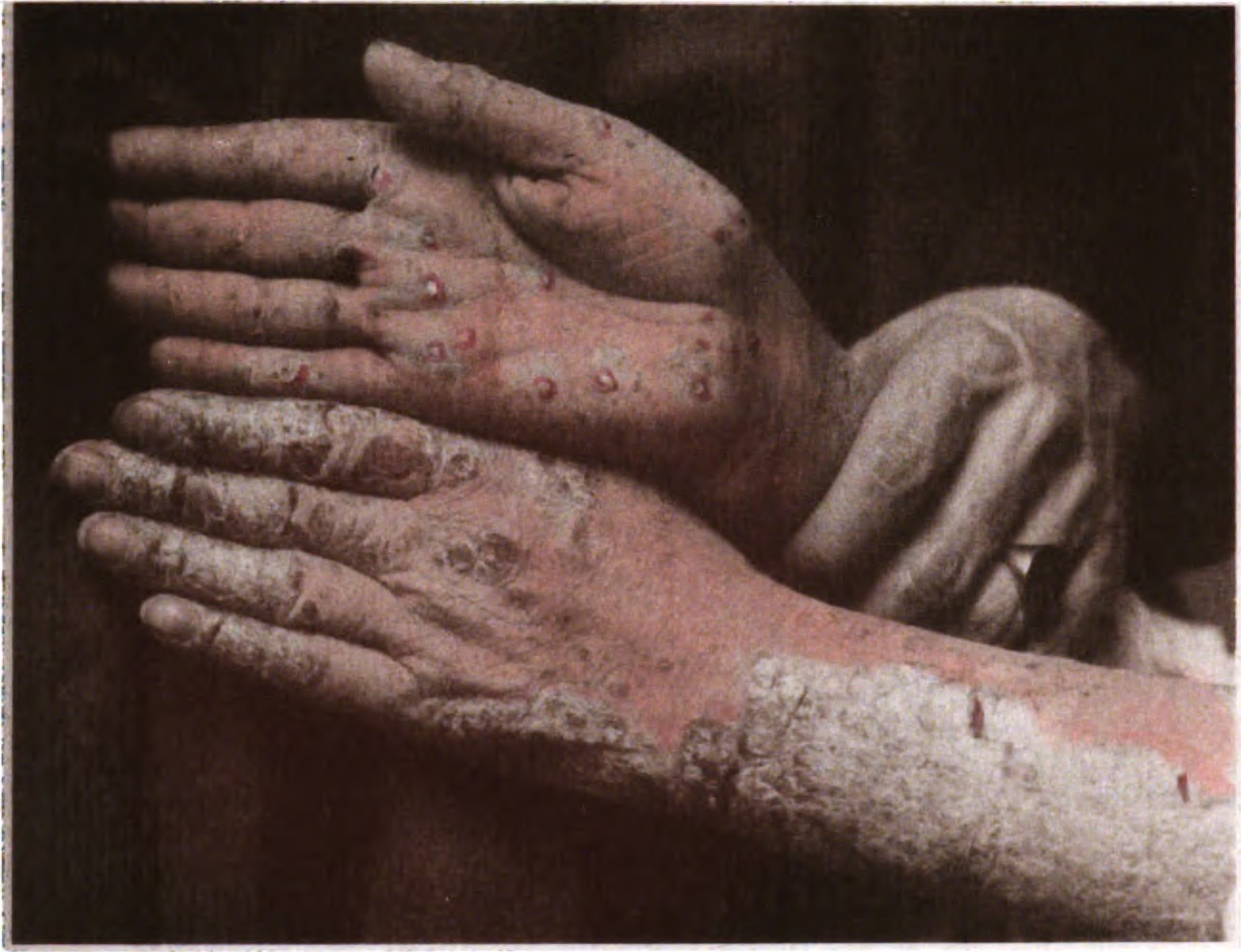
- Severe pustular psoriasis.
- Types: localized pustular psoriasis, generalized pustular psoriasis

The term pustular psoriasis is used for a heterogeneous group of diseases that share pustular skin characteristics.

== Signs and symptoms ==
Characteristics may vary according to the subtype of pustular psoriasis. For example, it can be localized, commonly to the hands and feet (localized pustular psoriasis), or generalized with widespread patches appearing randomly on any part of the body (generalized pustular psoriasis). However, all forms of pustular psoriasis share in common the presence of red and tender blotchy skin covered with pustules.

Pustular psoriasis can be localized, commonly to the hands and feet (palmoplantar pustulosis), or generalized with widespread patches occurring randomly on any part of the body. Acrodermatitis continua is a form of localized psoriasis limited to the fingers and toes that may spread to the hands and feet. Pustulosis palmaris et plantaris is another form of localized pustular psoriasis similar to acrodermatitis continua with pustules erupting from red, tender, scaly skin found on the palms of the hands and the soles of the feet.

== Diagnosis ==
=== Classification ===
Pustular psoriasis is classified into two major forms: localized and generalized pustular psoriasis. Within these two categories there are several variants:

Classification of Localized and Generalized Pustular Psoriasis
Localized pustular psoriasis
- Palmoplantar pustulosis (acute and chronic)
- Acrodermatitis continua (of Hallopeau)
Generalized pustular psoriasis
- (von Zumbusch) acute generalized pustular psoriasis
- Acute generalized pustular psoriasis of pregnancy (impetigo herpetiformis)
- Infantile and juvenile
- Subacute circinate and annular

==== Generalized pustular psoriasis ====
Generalized pustular psoriasis (GPP) is also known as (von Zumbusch) acute generalized pustular psoriasis in acute cases, and as impetigo herpetiformis during pregnancy. GPP is a rare and severe form of psoriasis that may require hospitalization. This form of psoriasis is characterized by an acute onset of numerous pustules on top of tender red skin. This skin eruption is often accompanied by a fever, muscle aches, nausea, and an elevated white blood cell count.

A rare form of GPP, annular pustular psoriasis (APP), is the most common type seen during childhood. APP tends to occur in women more frequently than in men, and is usually less severe than other forms of generalized pustular psoriasis such as impetigo herpetiformis. This form of psoriasis is characterized by ring-shaped plaques with pustules around the edges and yellow crusting. APP most often affects the torso, neck, arms, and legs.
