= Napkin psoriasis =

Skin disease of infants

- Specialty: Dermatology

Napkin psoriasis, or psoriasis in the diaper area, is characteristically seen in infants under the age of two. It is the most common form of psoriasis in infants and is commonly detected when diaper dermatitis spreads beyond the diaper area.

== See also ==
- Psoriasis
- Skin lesion
