= Psoriasis =

Autoimmune diseases of the skin

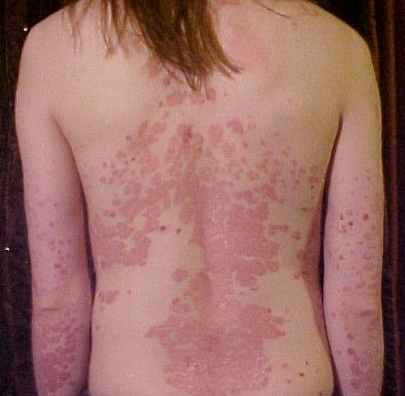
- Back and arms of a person with severe psoriasis
- Pronunciation: /səˈraɪəsəs/
- Specialty: Dermatology, immunology, rheumatology
- Symptoms: Red (purple on darker skin), itchy, scaly patches of skin
- Complications: Psoriatic arthritis
- Usual onset: Adulthood
- Duration: Long-term
- Causes: Genetic disease triggered by environmental factors
- Diagnostic method: Based on symptoms
- Treatment: Steroid creams, vitamin D_{3} cream, ultraviolet light, immunosuppressive drugs such as methotrexate and biologics
- Frequency: 79.7 million / 2–4%

Psoriasis is a long-lasting, noncontagious autoimmune disease characterized by patches of abnormal skin. These areas are red, pink, or purple, dry, itchy, and scaly. Psoriasis varies in severity from small localized patches to complete body coverage. Injury to the skin can trigger psoriatic skin changes at that spot, which is known as the Koebner phenomenon.

The five main types of psoriasis are plaque, guttate, inverse, pustular, and erythrodermic. Plaque psoriasis, also known as psoriasis vulgaris, makes up about 90% of cases. It typically presents as red patches with white scales on top. Areas of the body most commonly affected are the back of the forearms, shins, navel area and scalp. Guttate psoriasis has drop-shaped lesions. Pustular psoriasis presents as small, noninfectious, pus-filled blisters. Inverse psoriasis forms red patches in skin folds. Erythrodermic psoriasis occurs when the rash becomes very widespread and can develop from any of the other types. Fingernails and toenails are affected in most people with psoriasis at some point in time. This may include pits in the nails or changes in nail color.

Psoriasis is generally thought to be a genetic disease that is triggered by environmental factors. If one twin has psoriasis, the other twin is three times more likely to be affected if the twins are identical than if they are nonidentical. This suggests that genetic factors predispose to psoriasis. Symptoms often worsen during winter and with certain medications, such as beta blockers or NSAIDs. Infections and psychological stress can also play a role. The underlying mechanism involves the immune system reacting to skin cells. Diagnosis is typically based on the signs and symptoms.

There is no known cure for psoriasis, but various treatments can help control the symptoms. These treatments include steroid creams, vitamin D_{3} cream, ultraviolet light, immunosuppressive drugs, such as methotrexate, and biologic therapies targeting specific immunologic pathways. About 75% of skin involvement improves with creams alone. The disease affects 2–4% of the population. Men and women are affected with equal frequency. The disease may begin at any age, but typically starts in adulthood. Psoriasis is associated with an increased risk of psoriatic arthritis, lymphomas, cardiovascular disease, Crohn's disease, and depression. Psoriatic arthritis affects up to 30% of individuals with psoriasis.

The word "psoriasis" is from Greek ψωρίασις meaning 'itching condition' or 'being itchy', from psora 'itch', and -iasis 'action, condition'.

== Signs and symptoms ==
=== Plaque psoriasis ===
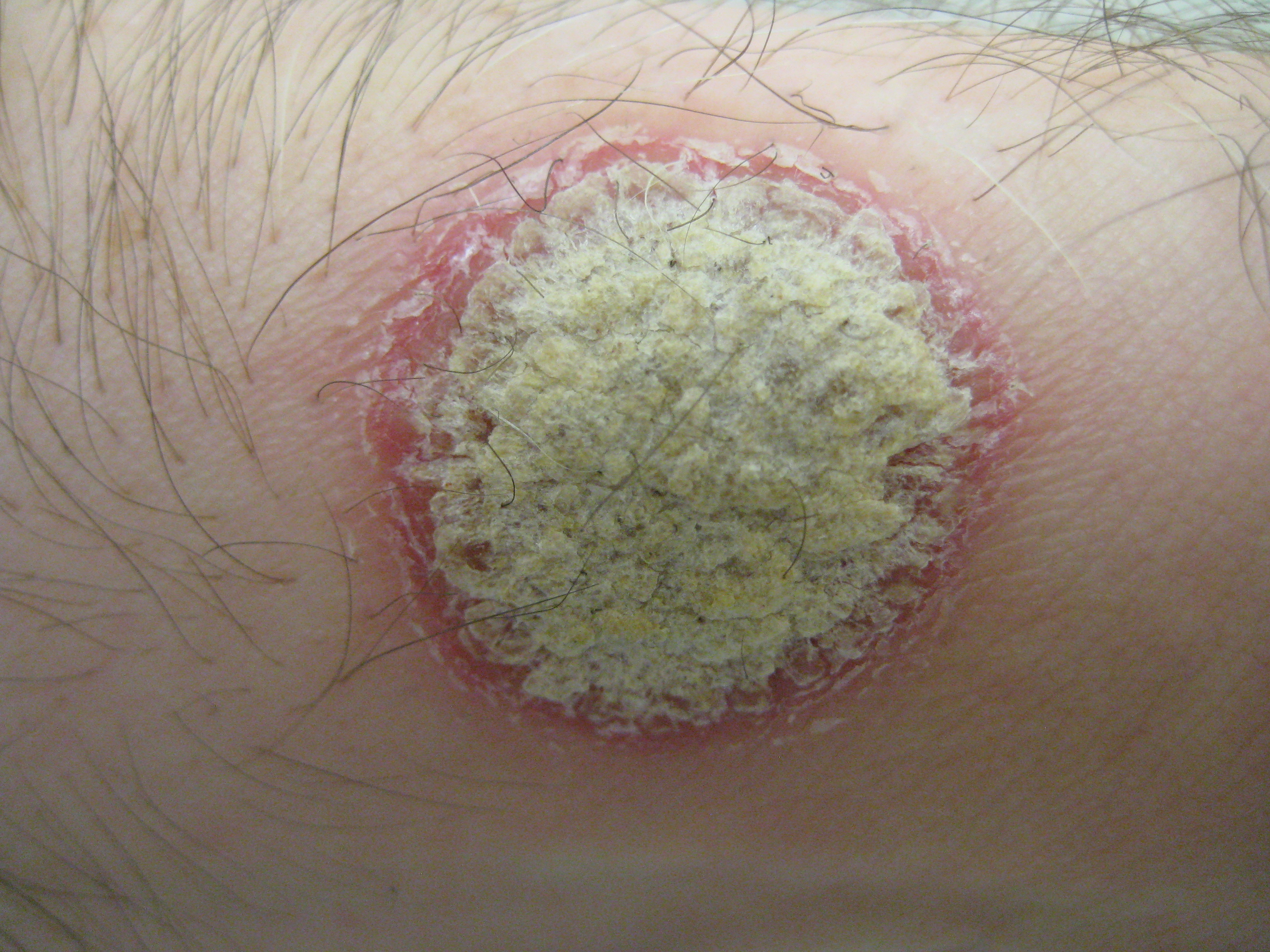
Psoriatic plaque, showing a silvery center surrounded by a reddened border

Psoriasis vulgaris (also known as chronic stationary psoriasis or plaque-like psoriasis) is the most common form and affects 85–90% of people with psoriasis. Plaque psoriasis typically appears as raised areas of inflamed skin covered with silvery-white, scaly skin. These areas are called plaques and are most commonly found on the elbows, knees, scalp, and back. On darker skin tones (Fitzpatrick skin types IV–VI), psoriasis plaques frequently appear violaceous (purplish), dark brown, or gray with thicker scaling rather than the classic "salmon-pink" erythema seen on lighter skin, which can contribute to delayed diagnosis.

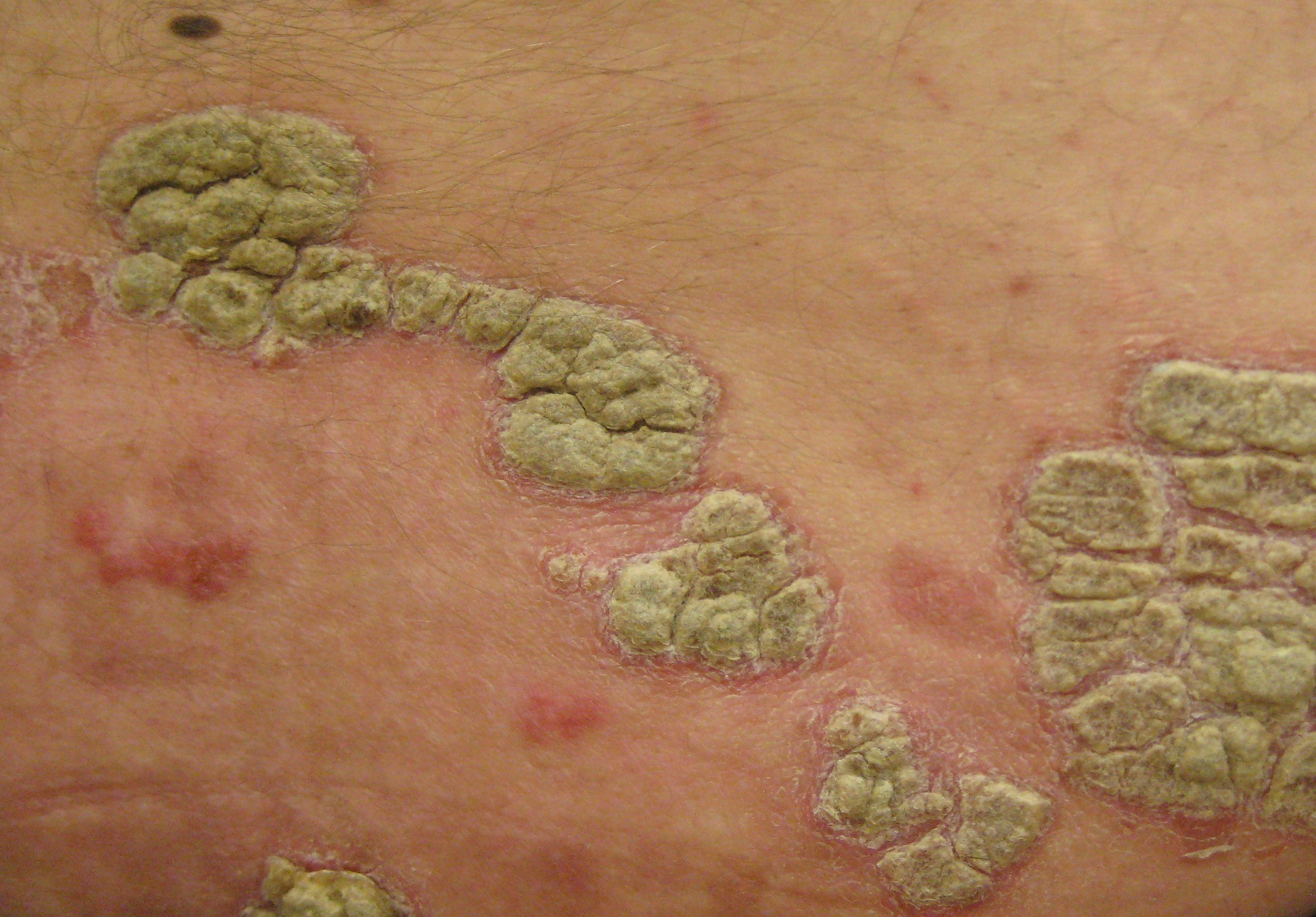
Plaques of psoriasis

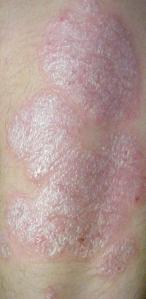
A person's arm covered with plaque psoriasis

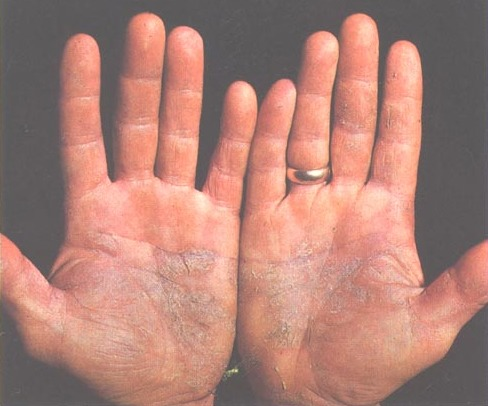
Psoriasis of the palms

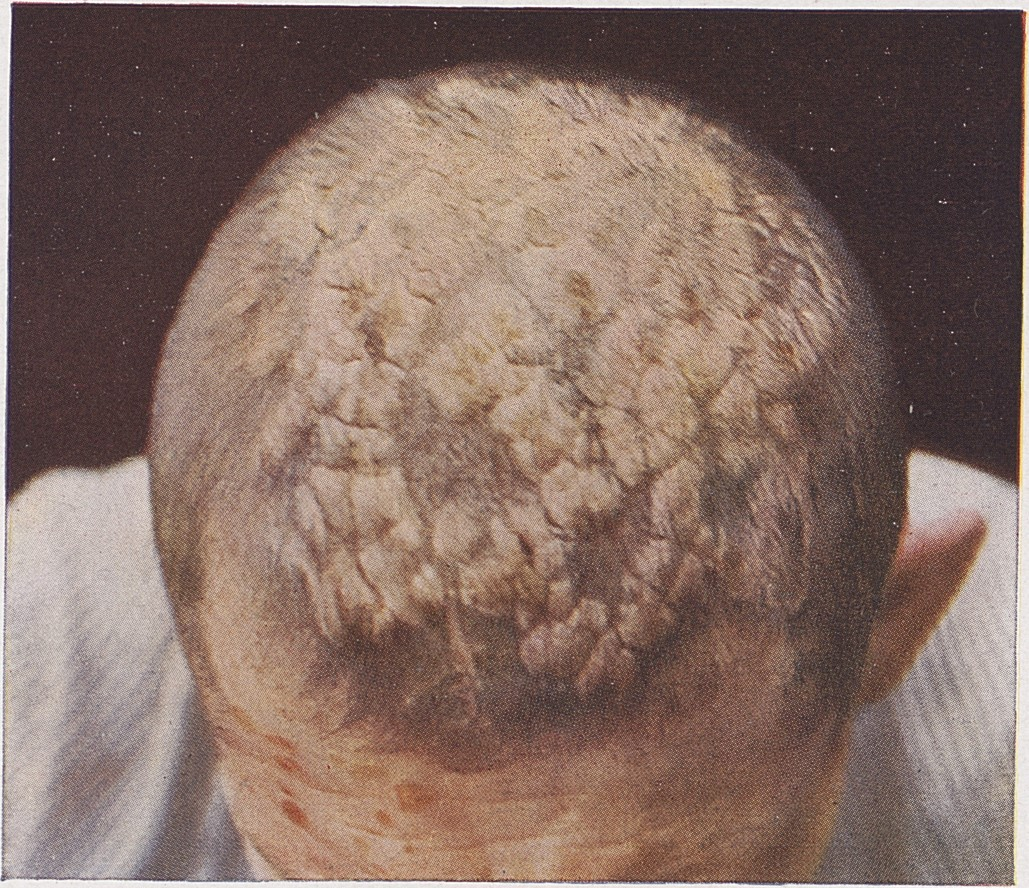
Psoriasis of the scalp

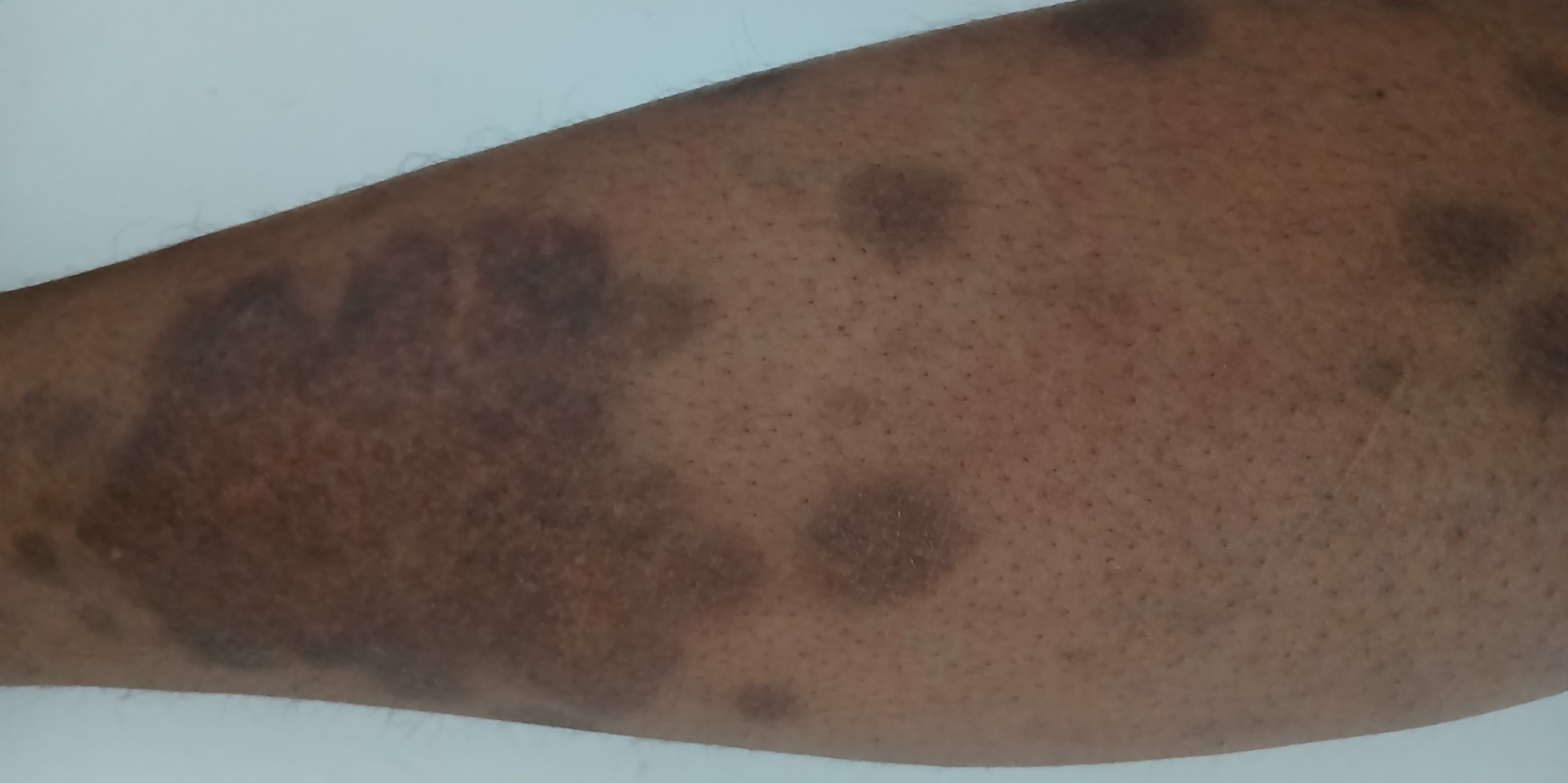
Psoriasis on a leg

=== Other forms ===
Additional psoriasis types comprise about 10% of cases. They include pustular, inverse, napkin, guttate, oral, and seborrheic-like forms.

==== Pustular psoriasis ====
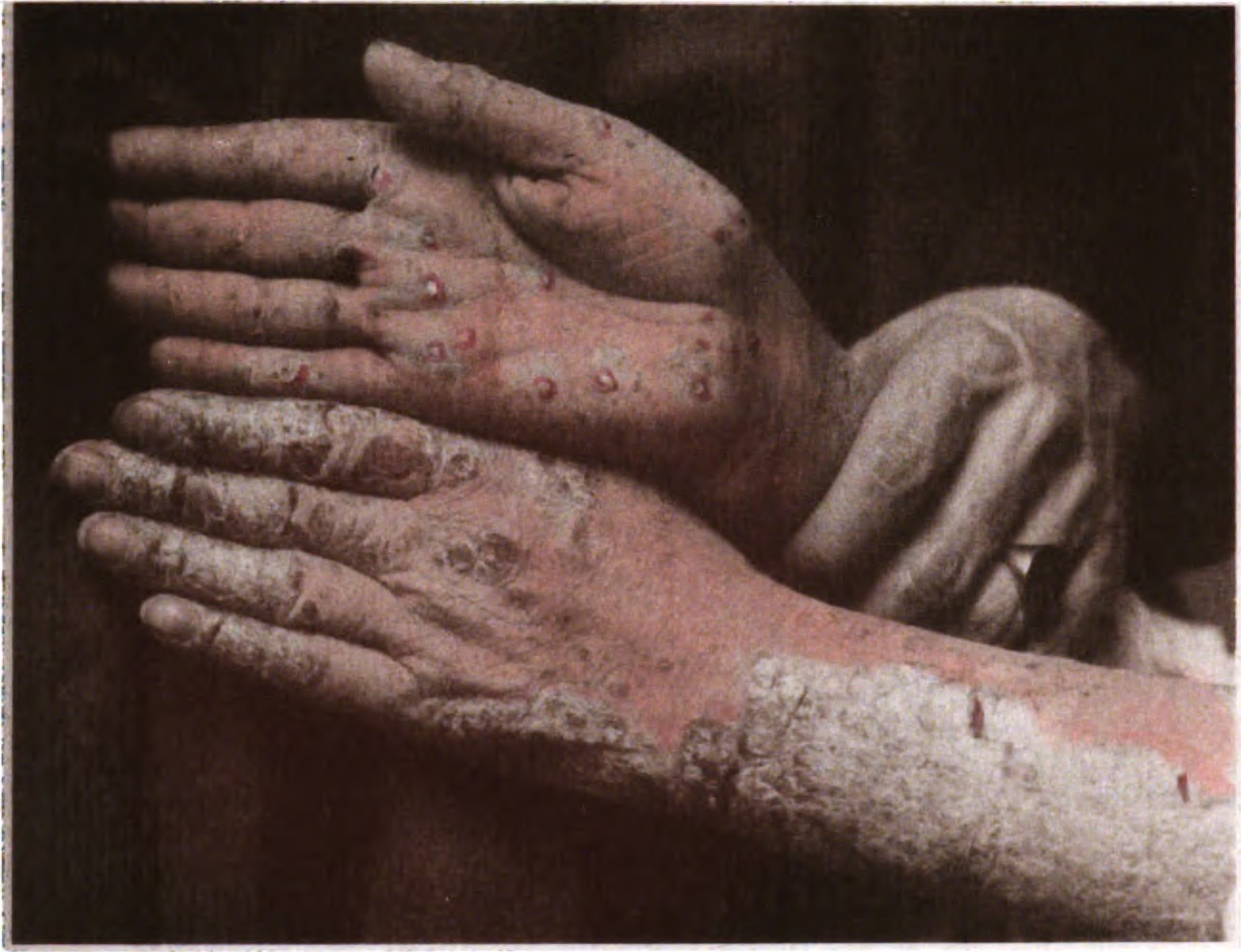
Severe generalized pustular psoriasis

Pustular psoriasis appears as raised bumps filled with noninfectious pus (pustules). The skin under and surrounding the pustules is red and tender. Pustular psoriasis can either be localized or more widespread throughout the body. Two types of localized pustular psoriasis include psoriasis pustulosa palmoplantaris and acrodermatitis continua of Hallopeau; both forms are localized to the hands and feet.

==== Inverse psoriasis ====
Inverse psoriasis (also known as flexural psoriasis) appears as smooth, inflamed patches of skin. The patches frequently affect skin folds, particularly around the genitals (between the thigh and groin), the armpits, in the skin folds of an overweight abdomen (known as panniculus), between the buttocks in the intergluteal cleft, and under the breasts in the inframammary fold. Heat, trauma, and infection are thought to play a role in the development of this atypical form of psoriasis.

==== Napkin psoriasis ====
Napkin psoriasis is a subtype of psoriasis common in infants under the age of two and is characterized by red papules with silver scales in the diaper area that may extend to the torso or limbs. Napkin psoriasis is often misdiagnosed as napkin dermatitis (diaper rash). It typically improves as children age and may later present in more common forms as plaque psoriasis or inverse psoriasis.

==== Guttate psoriasis ====
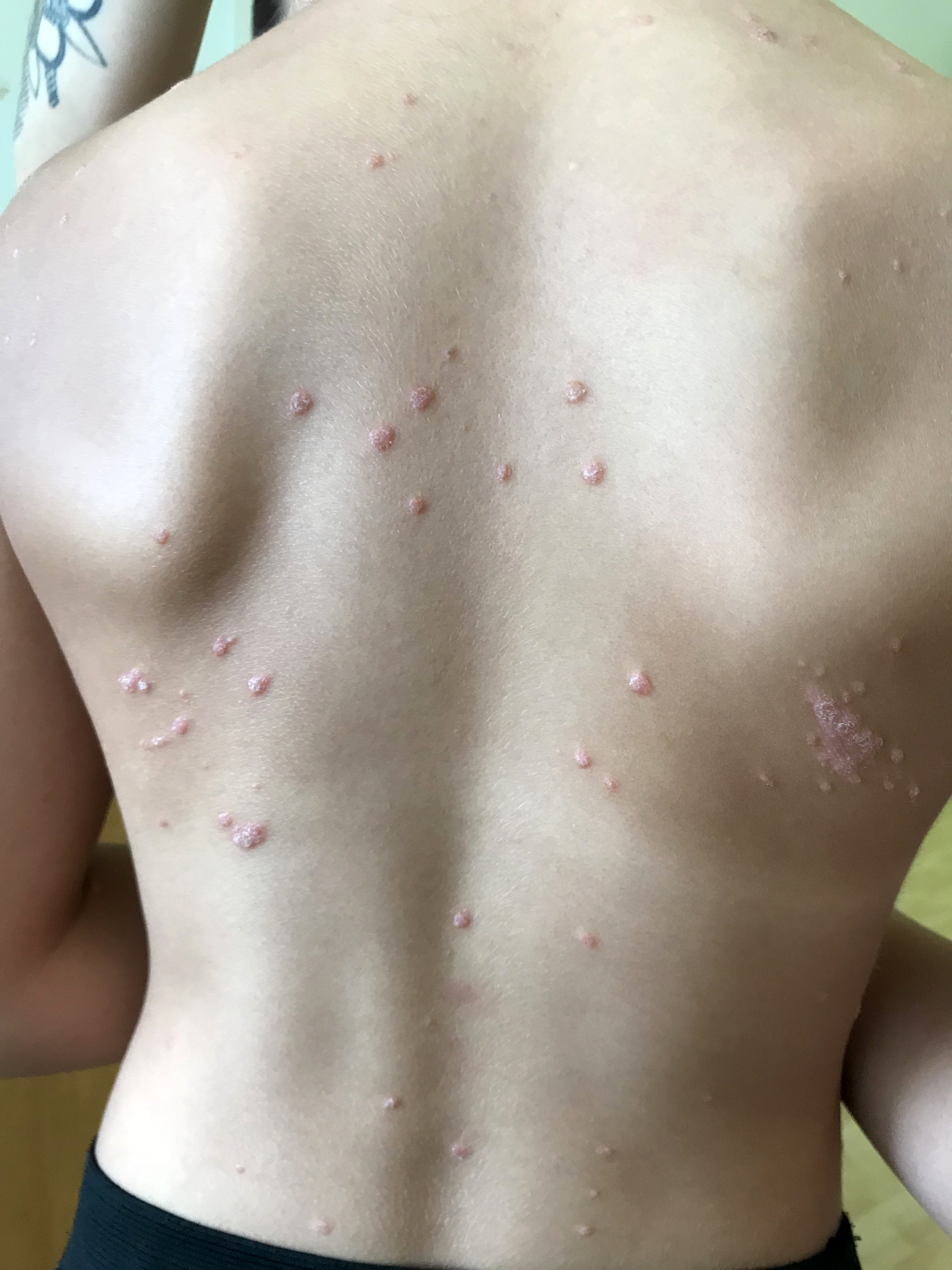
Example of guttate psoriasis

Guttate psoriasis is an inflammatory condition characterized by numerous small, scaly, red or pink, droplet-like lesions (papules). These numerous papules appear over large areas of the body, primarily the trunk, limbs, and scalp, but typically spare the palms and soles. Guttate psoriasis is often triggered by a streptococcal infection (oropharyngeal or perianal) and typically occurs 1–3 weeks post-infection. Guttate psoriasis is most commonly seen in children and young adults, and diagnosis is typically made based on history and clinical exam findings. Skin biopsy can also be performed which typically shows a psoriasiform reaction pattern characterized by epidermal hyperplasia with elongation of the rete ridges.

There is no firm evidence regarding the best management for guttate psoriasis; however, first-line therapy for mild guttate psoriasis typically includes topical corticosteroids. Phototherapy can be used for moderate or severe guttate psoriasis. Biologic treatments have not been well studied in the treatment of guttate psoriasis.

Guttate psoriasis has a better prognosis than plaque psoriasis and typically resolves within 1–3 weeks; however, up to 40% of patients with guttate psoriasis eventually convert to plaque psoriasis.

==== Erythrodermic psoriasis ====
Psoriatic erythroderma (erythrodermic psoriasis) involves widespread inflammation and exfoliation of the skin over most of the body surface, often involving greater than 90% of the body surface area. It may be accompanied by severe dryness, itching, swelling, and pain. It can develop from any type of psoriasis. It is often the result of an exacerbation of unstable plaque psoriasis, particularly following the abrupt withdrawal of systemic glucocorticoids. This form of psoriasis can be fatal as the extreme inflammation and exfoliation disrupt the body's ability to regulate temperature and perform barrier functions.

==== Mouth ====
Psoriasis in the mouth is very rare, in contrast to lichen planus, another common papulosquamous disorder that commonly involves both the skin and mouth. When psoriasis involves the oral mucosa (the lining of the mouth), it may be asymptomatic, but it may appear as white or grey-yellow plaques. Fissured tongue is the most common finding in those with oral psoriasis and has been reported to occur in 6.5–20% of people with psoriasis affecting the skin. The microscopic appearance of oral mucosa affected by geographic tongue (migratory stomatitis) is very similar to the appearance of psoriasis. A recent study found an association between the two conditions, and it suggests that geographic tongue might be a predictor for psoriasis.

==== Seborrheic-like psoriasis ====
Seborrheic-like psoriasis is a common form of psoriasis with clinical aspects of psoriasis and seborrheic dermatitis, and it may be difficult to distinguish from the latter. This form of psoriasis typically manifests as red plaques with greasy scales in areas of higher sebum production such as the scalp, forehead, skin folds next to the nose, the skin surrounding the mouth, skin on the chest above the sternum, and in skin folds.

=== Psoriatic arthritis ===
Psoriatic arthritis is a form of chronic inflammatory arthritis that has a highly variable clinical presentation and frequently occurs in association with skin and nail psoriasis. It typically involves painful inflammation of the joints and surrounding connective tissue and can occur in any joint, but most commonly affects the joints of the fingers and toes. This can result in a sausage-shaped swelling of the fingers and toes known as dactylitis. Psoriatic arthritis can also affect the hips, knees, spine (spondylitis), and sacroiliac joint (sacroiliitis). About 30% of individuals with psoriasis will develop psoriatic arthritis. Skin manifestations of psoriasis tend to occur before arthritic manifestations in about 75% of cases.

=== Nail changes ===
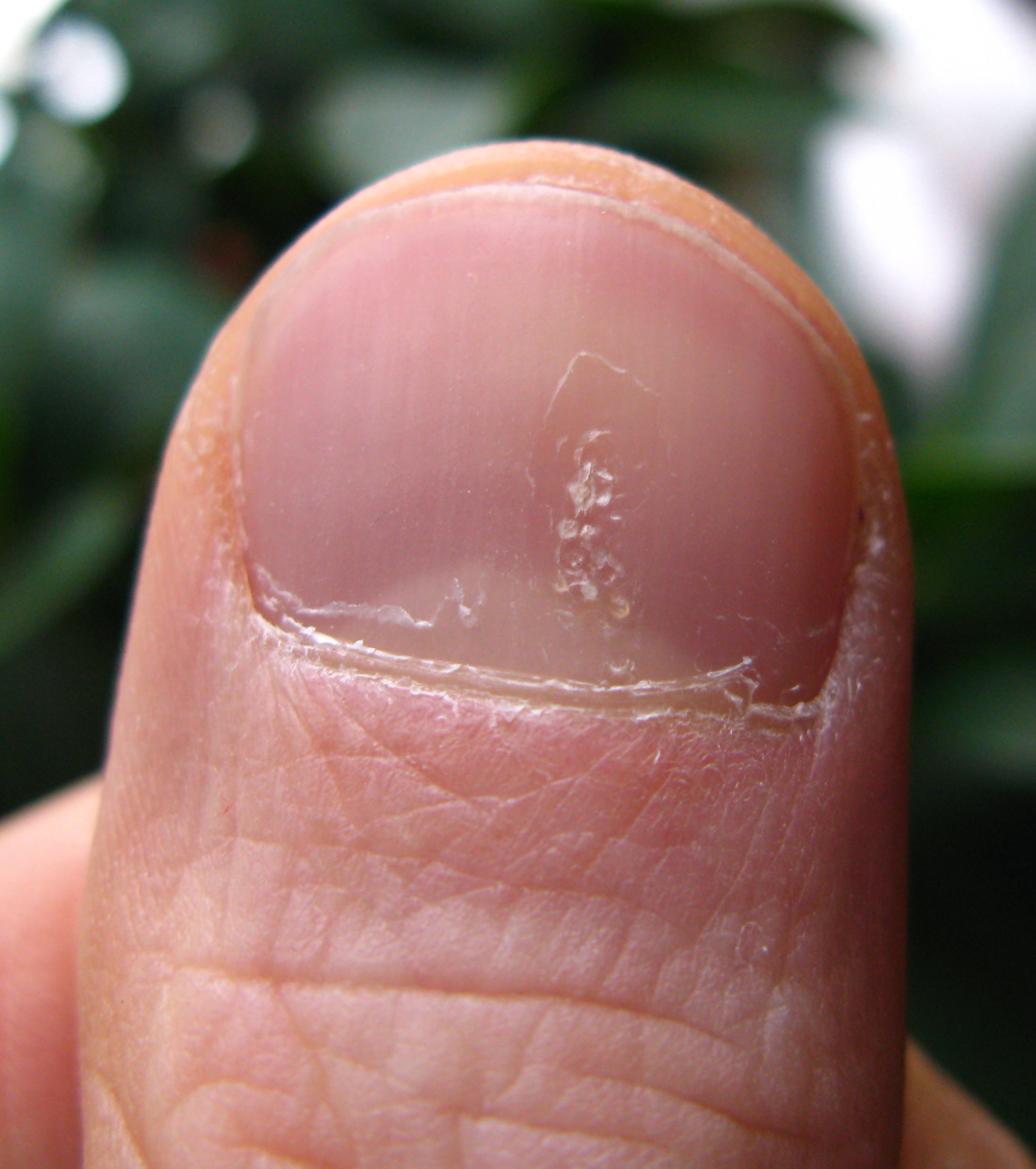
Psoriasis of a fingernail, with visible pitting

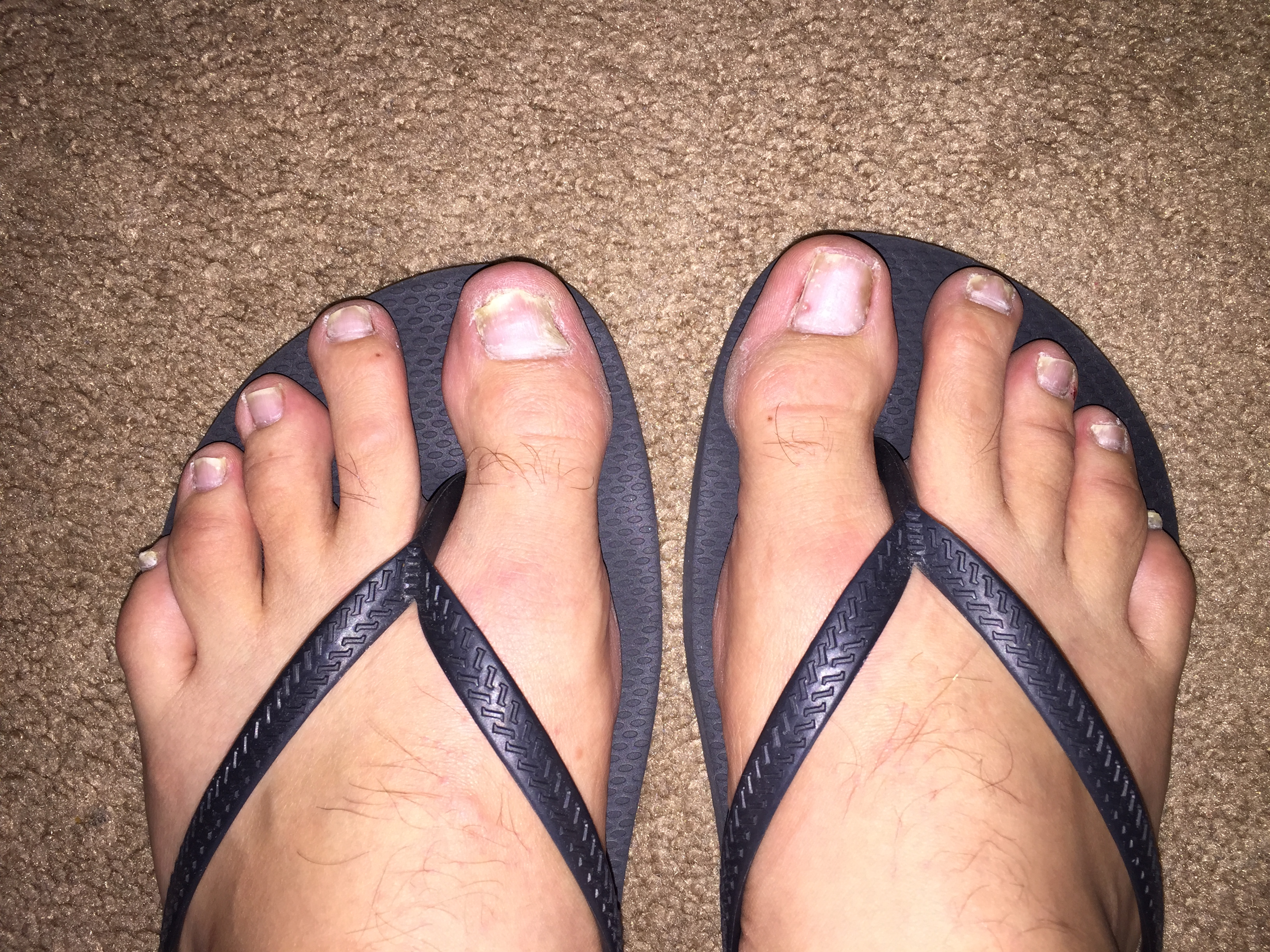
Effect of psoriasis on the toenails

Psoriasis can affect the nails and produces a variety of changes in the appearance of fingers and toenails. Nail psoriasis occurs in 40–45% of people with psoriasis affecting the skin, and has a lifetime incidence of 80–90% in those with psoriatic arthritis. These changes include pitting of the nails (pinhead-sized depressions in the nail is seen in 70% with nail psoriasis), whitening of the nail, small areas of bleeding from capillaries under the nail, yellow-reddish discoloration of the nails known as the oil drop or salmon spots, dryness, thickening of the skin under the nail (subungual hyperkeratosis), loosening and separation of the nail (onycholysis), and crumbling of the nail.

=== Medical signs ===
In addition to the appearance and distribution of the rash, specific medical signs may be used by medical practitioners to assist with diagnosis. These may include Auspitz's sign (pinpoint bleeding when the scale is removed), Koebner phenomenon (psoriatic skin lesions induced by trauma to the skin), and itching and pain localized to papules and plaques.

== Causes ==
The cause of psoriasis is not fully understood. Genetics, seasonal changes, skin damage, climate, immunocompromised state, specific infections, and the use of some medications have been connected with different types of psoriasis.

=== Genetics ===
Around one-third of people with psoriasis report a family history of the disease, and researchers have identified genetic loci associated with the condition. Identical twin studies suggest a 70% chance of a twin developing psoriasis if the other twin has the disorder. The risk is around 20% for fraternal twins. These findings suggest both a genetic susceptibility and an environmental response in developing psoriasis.

Psoriasis has a strong hereditary component, and many genes are associated with it, but how those genes work together is unclear. Most of the identified genes relate to the immune system, particularly the major histocompatibility complex (MHC) and T cells. Genetic studies are valuable since they can identify molecular mechanisms and pathways for further study and potential medication targets.

Classic genome-wide linkage analysis has identified nine loci on different chromosomes associated with psoriasis. They are called psoriasis susceptibility 1 through 9 (PSORS1 through PSORS9). Within those loci are genes on pathways that lead to inflammation. Certain variations (mutations) of those genes are commonly found in psoriasis. Genome-wide association scans have identified other genes that are altered to characteristic variants in psoriasis. Some of these genes express inflammatory signal proteins, which affect cells in the immune system that are also involved in psoriasis. Some of these genes are also involved in other autoimmune diseases.

The major determinant is PSORS1, which probably accounts for 35–50% of psoriasis heritability. It controls genes that affect the immune system or encode skin proteins that are overabundant in psoriasis. PSORS1 is located on chromosome 6 in the MHC, which controls important immune functions. Three genes in the PSORS1 locus have a strong association with psoriasis vulgaris: HLA-C variant HLA-Cw6, which encodes an MHC class I protein; CCHCR1, variant WWC, which encodes a coiled coil protein overexpressed in psoriatic epidermis; and CDSN, variant allele 5, which encodes corneodesmosin, a protein expressed in the granular and cornified layers of the epidermis and upregulated in psoriasis.

Two major immune system genes under investigation are interleukin-12 subunit beta (IL12B) on chromosome 5q, which expresses interleukin-12B; and IL23R on chromosome 1p, which expresses the interleukin-23 receptor and is involved in T cell differentiation. Interleukin-23 receptor and IL12B have both been strongly linked with psoriasis. T cells are involved in the inflammatory process that leads to psoriasis. These genes are on the pathway that upregulates tumor necrosis factor-α and nuclear factor κB, two genes involved in inflammation. The first gene directly linked to psoriasis was identified as the CARD14 gene located in the PSORS2 locus. A rare mutation in the gene encoding for the CARD14-regulated protein, plus an environmental trigger, was enough to cause plaque psoriasis (the most common form of psoriasis).

=== Lifestyle ===
Conditions reported as worsening the disease include chronic infections, stress, and changes in season and climate. Other factors that might worsen the condition include hot water, scratching psoriasis skin lesions, skin dryness, excessive alcohol consumption, cigarette smoking, and obesity. The effects of stopping cigarette smoking or alcohol misuse have yet to be studied as of 2019.Exposure to cold weather may also amplify psoriasis symptoms by removing moisture from skin.

=== HIV ===
The rate of psoriasis in human immunodeficiency virus-positive (HIV) individuals is comparable to that of HIV-negative individuals. Psoriasis tends to be more severe in people infected with HIV. A much higher rate of psoriatic arthritis occurs in HIV-positive individuals with psoriasis than in those without the infection. The immune response in those infected with HIV is typically characterized by cellular signals from T_{h}2 subset of CD4+ helper T cells, whereas the immune response in psoriasis vulgaris is characterized by a pattern of cellular signals typical of T_{h}1 subset of CD4+ helper T cells and T_{h}17 helper T cells. The diminished CD4+ T cell presence is thought to cause overactivation of CD8+ T cells, which are responsible for the exacerbation of psoriasis in HIV-positive people. Psoriasis in those with HIV/AIDS is often severe and may be untreatable with conventional therapy. In those with long-term, well-controlled psoriasis, new HIV infection can trigger a severe flare-up of psoriasis and/or psoriatic arthritis.

=== Microbes ===
Psoriasis has been described as occurring after strep throat. It may be worsened by skin or gut colonization with Staphylococcus aureus, Malassezia spp., and Candida albicans. Guttate psoriasis often affects children and adolescents and can be triggered by a recent group A streptococcal infection (tonsillitis or pharyngitis).

=== Medications ===
Drug-induced psoriasis may occur with beta blockers, lithium, antimalarial medications, nonsteroidal anti-inflammatory drugs, terbinafine, calcium channel blockers, captopril, glyburide, granulocyte colony-stimulating factor, interleukins, interferons, lipid-lowering medications, and paradoxically TNF inhibitors such as infliximab or adalimumab. Withdrawal of corticosteroids (topical steroid cream) can aggravate psoriasis due to the rebound effect.

== Pathophysiology ==
Psoriasis is characterized by an abnormally excessive and rapid growth of the epidermal layer of the skin. Abnormal production of skin cells (especially during wound repair) and an overabundance of skin cells result from the sequence of pathological events in psoriasis. The sequence of pathological events in psoriasis is thought to start with an initiation phase in which an event (skin trauma, infection, or drugs) leads to activation of the immune system and then the maintenance phase consisting of chronic progression of the disease. Skin cells are replaced every 3–5 days in psoriasis rather than the usual 28–30 days. These changes are believed to stem from the premature maturation of keratinocytes induced by an inflammatory cascade in the dermis involving dendritic cells, macrophages, and T cells (three subtypes of immune cells). These immune cells move from the dermis to the epidermis and secrete inflammatory chemical signals (cytokines) such as interleukin-36γ, tumor necrosis factor-α, interleukin-1β, interleukin-6, and interleukin-22. These secreted inflammatory signals are believed to stimulate keratinocytes to proliferate. One hypothesis is that psoriasis involves a defect in regulatory T cells, and in the regulatory cytokine interleukin-10. The inflammatory cytokines found in psoriatic nails and joints (in the case of psoriatic arthritis) are similar to those of psoriatic skin lesions, suggesting a common inflammatory mechanism.

Gene mutations in proteins involved in the skin's ability to function as a barrier have been identified as markers of susceptibility for developing psoriasis.

Deoxyribonucleic acid (DNA) released from dying cells acts as an inflammatory stimulus in psoriasis and stimulates the receptors on certain dendritic cells, which in turn produce the cytokine interferon-α. In response to these chemical messages from dendritic cells and T cells, keratinocytes also secrete cytokines such as interleukin-1, interleukin-6, and tumor necrosis factor-α, which signal downstream inflammatory cells to arrive and stimulate additional inflammation.

Dendritic cells bridge the innate immune system and adaptive immune system. They are increased in psoriatic lesions and induce the proliferation of T cells and type 1 helper T cells (T_{h}1). Targeted immunotherapy, as well as psoralen and ultraviolet A (PUVA) therapy, can reduce the number of dendritic cells and favors a T_{H}2 cell cytokine secretion pattern over a T_{h}1/T_{h}17 cell cytokine profile. Psoriatic T cells move from the dermis into the epidermis and secrete interferon-γ and interleukin-17. Interleukin-23 is known to induce the production of interleukin-17 and interleukin-22. Interleukin-22 works in combination with interleukin-17 to induce keratinocytes to secrete neutrophil-attracting cytokines.

== Diagnosis ==
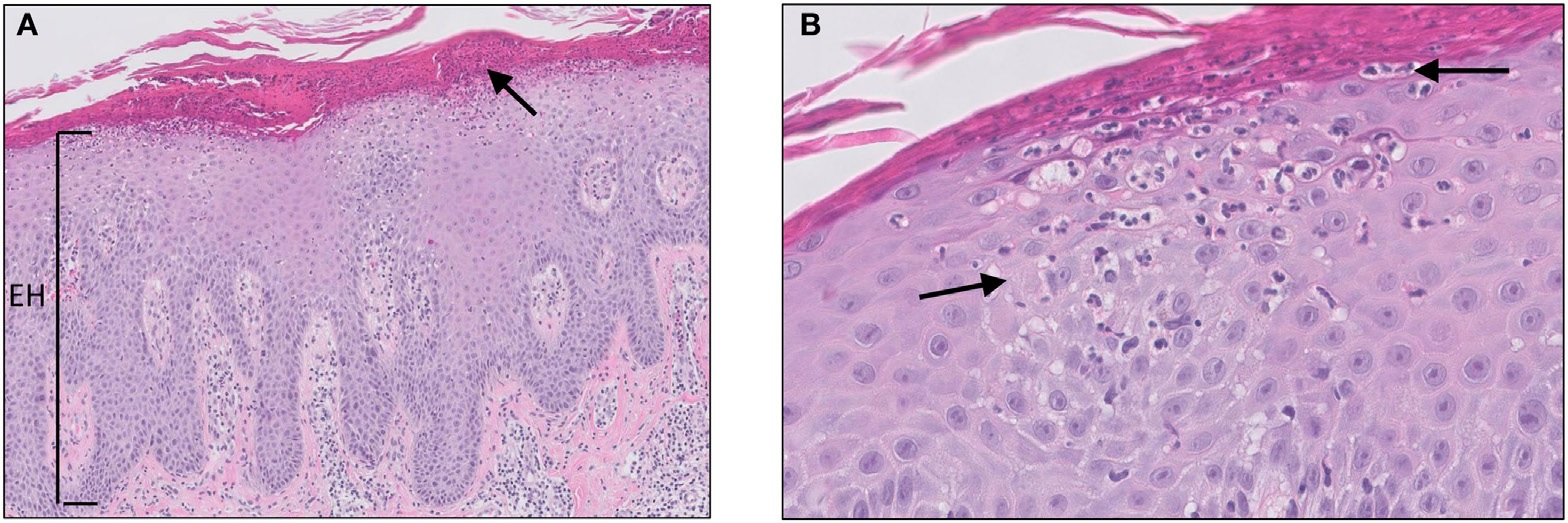
Micrograph of psoriasis vulgaris. Confluent parakeratosis, psoriasiform epidermal hyperplasia [(A), EH], hypogranulosis, and an influx of numerous neutrophils in the corneal layer [(A), arrow]. (B) Transepidermal migration of neutrophils from the dermis to the corneal layer (arrows).

A diagnosis of psoriasis is usually based on the appearance of the skin. Skin characteristics typical for psoriasis are scaly, erythematous plaques, papules, or patches of skin that may be painful and itchy. No special blood tests or diagnostic procedures are usually required to make the diagnosis.

The differential diagnosis of psoriasis includes dermatological conditions similar in appearance such as discoid eczema, seborrheic eczema, pityriasis rosea (may be confused with guttate psoriasis), nail fungus (may be confused with nail psoriasis) or cutaneous T cell lymphoma (50% of individuals with this cancer are initially misdiagnosed with psoriasis). Dermatologic manifestations of systemic illnesses such as the rash of secondary syphilis may also be confused with psoriasis.

If the clinical diagnosis is uncertain, a skin biopsy or scraping may be performed to rule out other disorders and to confirm the diagnosis. Skin from a biopsy shows clubbed epidermal projections that interdigitate with dermis on microscopy. Epidermal thickening is another characteristic histologic finding of psoriasis lesions. The stratum granulosum layer of the epidermis is often missing or significantly decreased in psoriatic lesions; the skin cells from the most superficial layer of skin are also abnormal as they never fully mature. Unlike their mature counterparts, these superficial cells keep their nuclei. Inflammatory infiltrates can typically be seen on microscopy when examining skin tissue or joint tissue affected by psoriasis. Epidermal skin tissue affected by psoriatic inflammation often has many CD8+ T cells. A predominance of CD4+ T cells comprises the inflammatory infiltrates of the dermal layer of skin and joints.

=== Classification ===
==== Morphological ====
Psoriasis Type	ICD-10 Code
Psoriasis Vulgaris	L40.0
Generalized pustular psoriasis	L40.1
Acrodermatitis continua	L40.2
Pustulosis palmaris et plantaris	L40.3
Guttate psoriasis	L40.4
Psoriatic arthritis	L40.50
Psoriatic spondylitis	L40.53
Inverse psoriasis	L40.8

Psoriasis is classified as a papulosquamous disorder and is most commonly subdivided into different categories based on histological characteristics. Variants include plaque, pustular, guttate, and flexural psoriasis. Each form has a dedicated ICD-10 code. Psoriasis can also be classified into nonpustular and pustular types.

==== Pathogenetic ====
Another classification scheme considers genetic and demographic factors. Type 1 has a positive family history, starts before the age of 40, and is associated with the human leukocyte antigen, HLA-Cw6. Conversely, type 2 does not show a family history, presents after age 40, and is not associated with HLA-Cw6. Type 1 accounts for about 75% of persons with psoriasis.

The classification of psoriasis as an autoimmune disease has sparked considerable debate. Researchers have proposed differing descriptions of psoriasis and psoriatic arthritis; some authors have classified them as autoimmune diseases while others have classified them as distinct from autoimmune diseases and referred to them as immune-mediated inflammatory diseases.

==== Severity ====
Distribution of severity

No consensus exists about how to classify psoriasis severity. Mild psoriasis has been defined as a percentage of body surface area (BSA)≤10, a Psoriasis Area and Severity Index (PASI) score ≤10, and a Dermatology Life Quality Index (DLQI) score ≤10. Moderate to severe psoriasis was defined by the same group as BSA >10 or PASI score >10 and a DLQI score >10.

The DLQI is a 10-question tool used to measure the impact of several dermatologic diseases on daily functioning. The DLQI score ranges from 0 (minimal impairment) to 30 (maximal impairment) and is calculated with each answer being assigned 0–3 points, with higher scores indicating greater social or occupational impairment.

The PASI is the most widely used measurement tool for psoriasis. It assesses lesion severity and the areas affected. The PASI score then combines these two factors into a single score from 0 (no disease) to 72 (maximal disease). Nevertheless, the PASI can be too unwieldy to use outside of research settings, which has led to attempts to simplify the index for clinical use.

== Co-morbidities ==
Psoriasis is not just a skin disease. The symptoms of psoriasis can sometimes go beyond the skin and can negatively affect the quality of life of affected individuals. Additionally, the co-morbidities increase the treatment and financial burden of psoriasis and should be considered when managing this condition.

=== Cardiovascular complications ===
There is a 2.2 times increased risk of cardiovascular complications in people with psoriasis. Also, people with psoriasis are more susceptible to myocardial infarction (heart attack) and stroke. It has been speculated that there is systemic inflammation in psoriasis, which drives "psoriatic march" and can cause other inflammatory complications including cardiovascular complications. A study used fluorodeoxyglucose F-18 positron emission tomography-computed tomography (FDG PET/CT) to measure aortic vascular inflammation in psoriasis patients, and found increased coronary artery disease indices, including total plaque burden, luminal stenosis, and high-risk plaques in people with psoriasis. Similarly, there is an 11% reduction in aortic vascular inflammation when the PASI score decreases by 75%.

=== Depression ===
Depression or depressive symptoms are present in 28–55% of people with psoriasis. People with psoriasis are often stigmatized due to visible disfigurement of the skin. Social stigmatization is a risk factor for depression; however, other immune system factors may also be related to the observed increased incidence of depression in people with psoriasis. There is some evidence that increased inflammatory signals in the body could also contribute to depression in people with chronic inflammatory diseases, including psoriasis.

=== Type 2 diabetes ===
People with psoriasis are at increased risk of developing type 2 diabetes (~1.5 odds ratio). A genome-wide genetic study found that psoriasis and type 2 diabetes share four loci, namely, ACTR2, ERLIN1, TRMT112, and BECN1, which are connected via the inflammatory NF-κB pathway.

== Management ==
Schematic of psoriasis treatment ladder

While no cure is available for psoriasis, many treatment options exist. Topical agents are typically used for mild disease, phototherapy for moderate disease, and systemic agents for severe disease. There is no evidence to support the effectiveness of conventional topical and systemic drugs, biological therapy, or phototherapy for acute guttate psoriasis or an acute guttate flare of chronic psoriasis.

=== Topical agents ===
Topical corticosteroid preparations are the most effective agents when used continuously for eight weeks; retinoids and coal tar were found to be of limited benefit and may be no better than placebo. Very potent topical corticosteroids may be helpful in some cases; however, it is suggested to use them only for four weeks at a time and only if other less potent topical treatment options are not working.

Vitamin D analogues (such as paricalcitol, calcipotriol, tacalcitol, and calcitriol) are superior to placebo. Combination therapy with vitamin D and a corticosteroid is superior to either treatment alone and vitamin D is superior to coal tar for chronic plaque psoriasis.

For psoriasis of the scalp, a 2016 review found dual therapy (vitamin D analogs and topical corticosteroids) or corticosteroid monotherapy more effective and safer than topical vitamin D analogs alone. Due to their similar safety profiles and minimal benefit of dual therapy over monotherapy, corticosteroid monotherapy appears to be an acceptable treatment for short-term treatment.

Moisturizers and emollients such as mineral oil, petroleum jelly, and decubal (an oil-in-water emollient) were found to increase the clearance of psoriatic plaques. Some emollients are even more effective at clearing psoriatic plaques when combined with phototherapy. Certain emollients, though, have no impact on psoriasis plaque clearance or may even decrease the clearance achieved with phototherapy, e.g., the emollient salicylic acid is structurally similar to para-aminobenzoic acid, commonly found in sunscreen, and is known to interfere with phototherapy in psoriasis. Coconut oil, when used as an emollient in psoriasis, has been found to decrease plaque clearance with phototherapy. Medicated creams and ointments applied directly to psoriatic plaques can help reduce inflammation, remove built-up scale, reduce skin turnover, and clear affected skin of plaques. Ointment and creams containing coal tar, dithranol, corticosteroids (i.e. desoximetasone), fluocinonide, vitamin D_{3} analogues (for example, calcipotriol), and retinoids are routinely used. (The use of the finger tip unit may help guide how much topical treatment to use.)

Vitamin D analogs may be useful with steroids; steroids alone have a higher rate of side effects. Vitamin D analogs may allow lower doses of steroids to be used.

Another topical therapy used to treat psoriasis is a form of balneotherapy, which involves daily baths in saltwater, such as the Dead Sea, combined with sun exposure. This is usually done for four weeks, in which exposure time is gradually increased. The primary benefit is attributed to sun exposure and specifically UVB light. This is cost-effective, and it has been propagated as an effective way to treat psoriasis without medication. Decreases of PASI scores greater than 75% and remission for several months have commonly been observed. Side effects may be mild, such as itchiness, folliculitis, sunburn, poikiloderma, and a theoretical risk of nonmelanoma cancer or melanoma has been suggested. Some studies indicate no increased risk of melanoma in the long term. Data are inconclusive concerning nonmelanoma skin cancer risk, but support the idea that the therapy is associated with an increased risk of benign forms of sun-induced skin damage, such as, but not limited to, actinic elastosis or liver spots. Dead Sea balneotherapy is also effective for psoriatic arthritis. Tentative evidence indicates that balneophototherapy, a combination of salt bathes and exposure to ultraviolet B-light (UVB), in chronic plaque psoriasis is better than UVB alone. Glycerin is also an effective treatment for Psoriasis.

=== UV phototherapy ===
Phototherapy in the form of sunlight has long been used for psoriasis. UVB wavelengths of 311–313 nanometers are most common. UV-B lamps have been developed for this treatment. The exposure time should be controlled to avoid overexposure and burning of the skin. The UVB lamps should have a timer that turns the lamp off when the time ends. The dose is increased with each treatment to get the skin used to the light. Increased rates of cancer from treatment appear to be small. Narrowband UVB therapy has been demonstrated to have similar efficacy to psoralen and ultraviolet A phototherapy (PUVA). A 2013 meta-analysis found no difference in efficacy between NB-UVB and PUVA in the treatment of psoriasis, but NB-UVB is usually more convenient.

One of the problems with clinical phototherapy is the difficulty many people have gaining access to a facility. Indoor tanning resources are almost ubiquitous today and could be considered as a means for people to get UV exposure when dermatologist-provided phototherapy is not available. Many people already use indoor tanning as a treatment for psoriasis; one indoor facility reported that 50% of its clients used the center for psoriasis treatment, and another reported 36% were doing the same. However, a concern with the use of commercial tanning is that tanning beds that primarily emit UVA might not effectively treat psoriasis. One study found that plaque psoriasis responds to erythemogenic doses of either UVA or UVB, as exposure to either can cause dissipation of psoriatic plaques. It does require more energy to reach erythemogenic dosing with UVA.

UV light therapies all have risks; tanning beds are no exception, being listed by the World Health Organization as carcinogens. Exposure to UV light is known to increase the risks of melanoma and squamous cell and basal cell carcinomas; younger people with psoriasis, particularly those under age 35, are at increased risk from melanoma from UV light treatment. A review of studies recommends that people who are susceptible to skin cancer exercise caution when using UV light therapy as a treatment.

A major mechanism of NB-UVB is the induction of DNA damage in the form of pyrimidine dimers. This type of phototherapy is useful in the treatment of psoriasis because the formation of these dimers interferes with the cell cycle and stops it. The interruption of the cell cycle induced by NB-UVB opposes the characteristic rapid division of skin cells seen in psoriasis. The activity of many types of immune cells found in the skin is also effectively suppressed by NB-UVB phototherapy treatments. The most common short-term side effect of this form of phototherapy is redness of the skin; less common side effects of NB-UVB phototherapy are itching and blistering of the treated skin, irritation of the eyes in the form of conjunctival inflammation or inflammation of the cornea, or cold sores due to reactivation of the herpes simplex virus in the skin surrounding the lips. Eye protection is usually given during phototherapy treatments.

PUVA combines the oral or topical administration of psoralen with exposure to ultraviolet A (UVA) light. The mechanism of action of PUVA is unknown, but likely involves activation of psoralen by UVA light, which inhibits the abnormally rapid cell production in psoriatic skin. There are multiple mechanisms of action associated with PUVA, including effects on the skin's immune system. PUVA is associated with nausea, headache, fatigue, burning, and itching. Long-term treatment is associated with squamous cell carcinoma (but not with melanoma). A combination therapy for moderate to severe psoriasis using PUVA plus acitretin resulted in benefit, but acitretin use has been associated with birth defects and liver damage.

=== Systemic agents ===
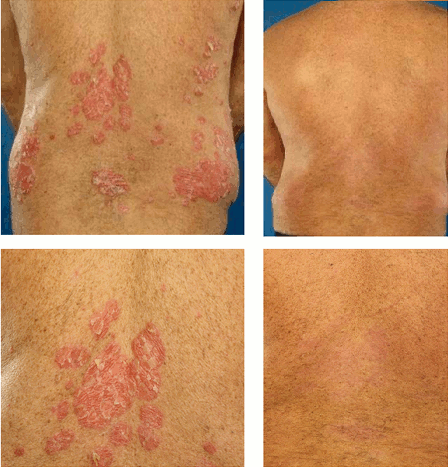
Pictures of a person with psoriasis (and psoriatic arthritis) at baseline and eight weeks after initiation of infliximab therapy

Psoriasis resistant to topical treatment and phototherapy may be treated with systemic therapies including medications by mouth or injectable treatments. People undergoing systemic treatment must have regular blood and liver function tests to check for medication toxicities. Pregnancy must be avoided for most of these treatments. The majority of people experience a recurrence of psoriasis after systemic treatment is discontinued.

Non-biologic systemic treatments frequently used for psoriasis include methotrexate, ciclosporin, hydroxycarbamide, fumarates such as dimethyl fumarate, and retinoids. Methotrexate and ciclosporin are medications that suppress the immune system; retinoids are synthetic forms of vitamin A. These agents are also regarded as first-line treatments for psoriatic erythroderma. Oral corticosteroids should not be used as they can severely flare psoriasis upon their discontinuation.

Biologics are manufactured proteins that interrupt the immune process involved in psoriasis. Unlike generalized immunosuppressive medical therapies such as methotrexate, biologics target specific aspects of the immune system contributing to psoriasis. These medications are generally well-tolerated, and limited long-term outcome data have demonstrated biologics to be safe for long-term use in moderate to severe plaque psoriasis. However, due to their immunosuppressive actions, biologics have been associated with a small increase in the risk for infection.

Guidelines consider biologics as a third-line treatment for plaque psoriasis following inadequate response to topical treatment, phototherapy, and non-biologic systemic treatments. The safety of biologics during pregnancy has not been assessed. European guidelines recommend avoiding biologics if a pregnancy is planned; anti-TNF therapies such as infliximab are not recommended for use in chronic carriers of the hepatitis B virus or individuals infected with HIV.

Several monoclonal antibodies target cytokines, the molecules that cells use to send inflammatory signals to each other. TNF-α is one of the main inflammatory cytokines. Four monoclonal antibodies (MAbs) (infliximab, adalimumab, golimumab, and certolizumab pegol) and one recombinant TNF-α decoy receptor, etanercept, have been developed to inhibit TNF-α signaling. Additional monoclonal antibodies, such as ixekizumab, have been developed against pro-inflammatory cytokines and inhibit the inflammatory pathway at a different point than the anti-TNF-α antibodies. IL-12 and IL-23 share a common domain, p40, which is the target of the FDA-approved ustekinumab. In 2017 the US FDA approved guselkumab for plaque psoriasis and in 2026 approved icotrokinra for moderate to severe plaque psoriasis. There have been few studies of the efficacy of anti-TNF medications for psoriasis in children. One randomized controlled study suggested that 12 weeks of etanercept treatment reduced the extent of psoriasis in children with no lasting adverse effects.

Two medications that target T cells are efalizumab and alefacept. Efalizumab is a monoclonal antibody that specifically targets the CD11a subunit of LFA-1. It also blocks the adhesion molecules on the endothelial cells that line blood vessels, which attract T cells. Efalizumab was voluntarily withdrawn from the European market in February 2009 and the U.S. market in June 2009, by the manufacturer due to the medication's association with cases of progressive multifocal leukoencephalopathy. Alefacept also blocks the molecules that dendritic cells use to communicate with T cells and even causes natural killer cells to kill T cells as a way of controlling inflammation. Apremilast may also be used.

Individuals with psoriasis may develop neutralizing antibodies against monoclonal antibodies. Neutralization occurs when an antidrug antibody prevents a monoclonal antibody, such as infliximab, from binding antigen in a laboratory test. Specifically, neutralization occurs when the anti-drug antibody binds to infliximab's antigen-binding site instead of TNF-α. When infliximab no longer binds tumor necrosis factor alpha, it no longer decreases inflammation, and psoriasis may worsen. Neutralizing antibodies have not been reported against etanercept, a biologic medication that is a fusion protein composed of two TNF-α receptors. The lack of neutralizing antibodies against etanercept is probably secondary to the innate presence of the TNF-α receptor and the development of immune tolerance.

There is strong evidence that infliximab, bimekizumab, ixekizumab, and risankizumab are the most effective biologics for treating moderate-to-severe cases of psoriasis. There is also some evidence to support use of secukinumab, brodalumab, guselkumab, certolizumab, and ustekinumab. In general, anti-IL17, anti-IL12/23, anti-IL23, and anti-TNF alpha biologics were found to be more effective than traditional systemic treatments. The immunologic pathways of psoriasis involve Th9, Th17, Th1 lymphocytes, and IL-22. The aforementioned biologic agents hinder different aspects of these pathways.

Another set of treatments for moderate to severe psoriasis are fumaric acid esters (FAE), which may be similar in effectiveness to methotrexate.

Apremilast (Otezla, Celgene) is an oral small-molecule inhibitor of the enzyme phosphodiesterase 4, which plays an important role in chronic inflammation associated with psoriasis.

It has been theorized that antistreptococcal medications may improve guttate and chronic plaque psoriasis; however, limited studies do not show that antibiotics are effective.

=== Surgery ===
Limited evidence suggests removal of the tonsils may benefit people with chronic plaque psoriasis, guttate psoriasis, and palmoplantar pustulosis.

=== Diet ===
Uncontrolled studies have suggested that individuals with psoriasis or psoriatic arthritis may benefit from a diet supplemented with fish oil rich in eicosapentaenoic acid (EPA) and docosahexaenoic acid (DHA). A low-calorie diet appears to reduce the severity of psoriasis. Diet recommendations include consumption of cold water fish (preferably wild fish, not farmed) such as salmon, herring, and mackerel; extra virgin olive oil; legumes; vegetables; fruits; and whole grains; and avoid consumption of alcohol, red meat, and dairy products (due to their saturated fat). The effect of caffeine consumption (including from coffee, black tea, mate, and dark chocolate) remains to be determined.

Many patients report improvements after consuming less tobacco, caffeine, sugar, nightshades (tomatoes, eggplant, peppers, paprika and white potatoes) and taking probiotics and oral Vitamin D.

There is a higher rate of celiac disease among people with psoriasis. When adopting a gluten-free diet, disease severity generally decreases in people with celiac disease and those with anti-gliadin antibodies.

== Prognosis ==
Most people with psoriasis experience nothing more than mild skin lesions that can be treated effectively with topical therapies. Depending on the severity and location of outbreaks, people may experience significant physical discomfort and some disability, affecting the person's quality of life. Itching and pain can interfere with basic functions, such as self-care and sleep. Participation in sporting activities, certain occupations, and caring for family members can become difficult activities for those with plaques located on their hands and feet. Plaques on the scalp can be particularly embarrassing, as flaky plaque in the hair can be mistaken for dandruff.

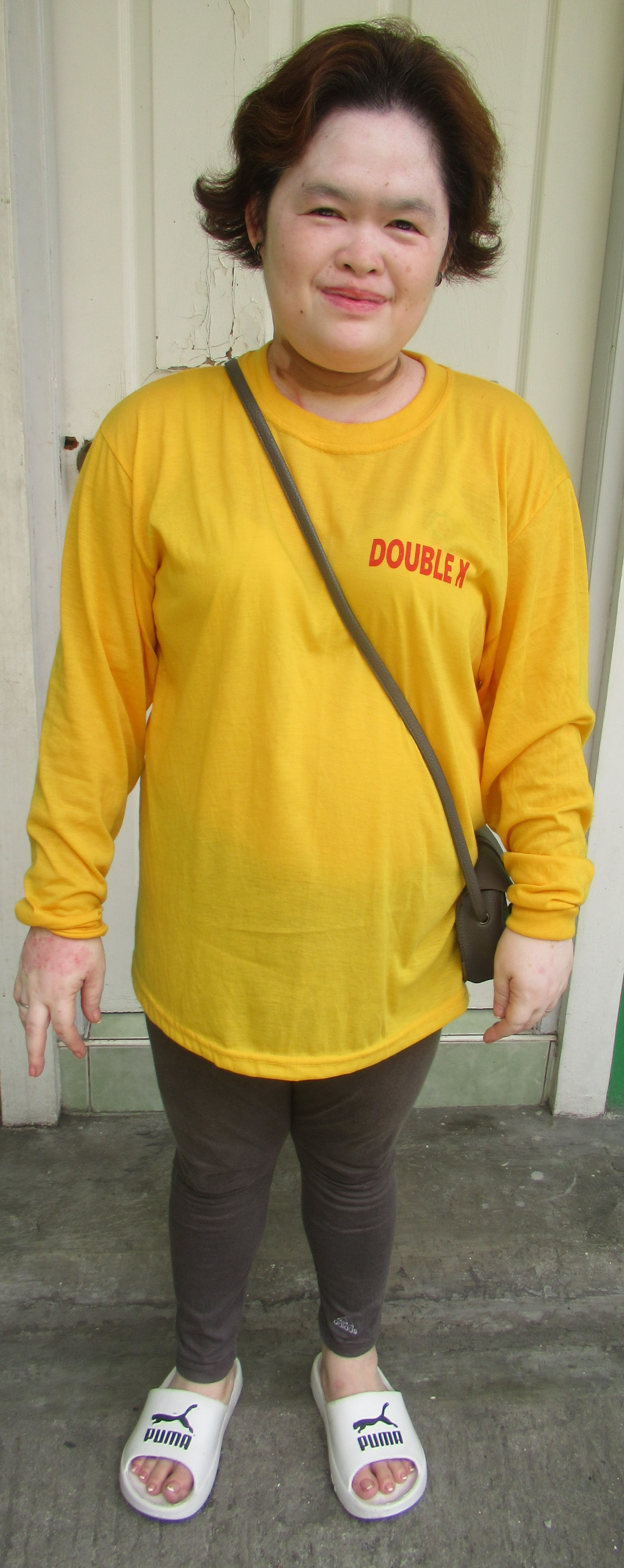
Woman with vitiligo psoriasis

Individuals with psoriasis may feel self-conscious about their appearance and have a poor self-image that stems from fear of public rejection and psychosexual concerns. Psoriasis has been associated with low self-esteem, and depression is more common among those with the condition. People with psoriasis often feel prejudiced against due to the commonly held incorrect belief that psoriasis is contagious. Psychological distress can lead to significant depression and social isolation; a high rate of thoughts about suicide has been associated with psoriasis. Many tools exist to measure the quality of life of people with psoriasis and other dermatological disorders. Clinical research has indicated that individuals often experience a diminished quality of life. Children with psoriasis may encounter bullying.

Several conditions are associated with psoriasis, including obesity, cardiovascular, and metabolic disturbances. These occur more frequently in older people. Nearly half of individuals with psoriasis over the age of 65 have at least three comorbidities (concurrent conditions), and two-thirds have at least two comorbidities.

=== Cardiovascular disease ===
Psoriasis has been associated with obesity and several other cardiovascular and metabolic disturbances. The number of new cases per year of diabetes is 27% higher in people affected by psoriasis than in those without the condition. Severe psoriasis may be even more strongly associated with the development of diabetes than mild psoriasis. Younger people with psoriasis may also be at increased risk for developing diabetes. Individuals with psoriasis or psoriatic arthritis have a slightly higher risk of heart disease and heart attacks when compared to the general population. Cardiovascular disease risk appeared to be correlated with psoriasis severity and its duration. There is no strong evidence to suggest that psoriasis is associated with an increased risk of death from cardiovascular events. Methotrexate may provide some protection for the heart.

The odds of having hypertension are 1.58 times ( i.e. 58%) higher in people with psoriasis than those without the condition; these odds are even higher with severe psoriasis. A similar association was noted in people who have psoriatic arthritis—the odds of having hypertension were found to be 2.07 times ( i.e., 107%) greater when compared to the odds of the general population. The link between psoriasis and hypertension is not currently understood. Mechanisms hypothesized to be involved in this relationship include the following: dysregulation of the renin–angiotensin system, elevated blood levels of endothelin 1, and increased oxidative stress. The number of new cases of the heart rhythm abnormality atrial fibrillation is 1.31 times ( i.e. 31%) higher in people with mild psoriasis and 1.63 times ( i.e. 63%) higher in people with severe psoriasis. There may be a slightly increased risk of stroke associated with psoriasis, especially in severe cases. Treating high levels of cholesterol with statins has been associated with decreased psoriasis severity, as measured by PASI score, and has also been associated with improvements in other cardiovascular disease risk factors such as markers of inflammation. These cardioprotective effects are attributed to ability of statins to improve blood lipid profile and because of their anti-inflammatory effects. Statin use in those with psoriasis and hyperlipidemia was associated with decreased levels of high-sensitivity C-reactive protein and TNFα as well as decreased activity of the immune protein LFA-1. Compared to individuals without psoriasis, those affected by psoriasis are more likely to satisfy the criteria for metabolic syndrome.

=== Other diseases ===
The rates of Crohn's disease and ulcerative colitis are increased when compared with the general population by a factor of 3.8 and 7.5, respectively. People with psoriasis also have a higher risk of celiac disease. Few studies have evaluated the association of multiple sclerosis with psoriasis, and the relationship has been questioned. Psoriasis has been associated with a 16% increase in overall relative risk for non-skin cancer, thought to be attributed to systemic therapy, particularly methotrexate. People treated with long-term systemic therapy for psoriasis have a 52% increased risk cancers of the lung and bronchus, a 205% increase in the risk of developing cancers of the upper gastrointestinal tract, a 31% increase in the risk of developing cancers of the urinary tract, a 90% increase in the risk of developing liver cancer, and a 46% increase in the risk of developing pancreatic cancer. The risk for the development of non-melanoma skin cancers is also increased. Psoriasis increases the risk of developing squamous cell carcinoma of the skin by 431% and increases the risk of basal cell carcinoma by 100%. There is no increased risk of melanoma associated with psoriasis. People with psoriasis have a higher risk of developing cancer.

== Epidemiology ==
Psoriasis is estimated to affect 2–4% of the population of the Western world. The rate of psoriasis varies according to age, region, and ethnicity; a combination of environmental and genetic factors is thought to be responsible for these differences. Psoriasis is about five times more common in people of European descent than in people of Asian descent, more common in countries farther from the equator, relatively uncommon in African Americans, and extremely uncommon in Native Americans. Psoriasis has been estimated to affect about 6.7 million Americans.

Psoriasis can occur at any age, although it is more frequent in adults and commonly appears for the first time between the ages of 15 and 25 years. Approximately one-third of people with psoriasis report being diagnosed before age 20. Psoriasis affects both sexes equally.

People with inflammatory bowel disease, such as Crohn's disease or ulcerative colitis, are at an increased risk of developing psoriasis.

== History ==
Scholars believe psoriasis to have been included among the various skin conditions called tzaraath (translated as leprosy) in the Hebrew Bible. The person was deemed "impure" (see tumah and taharah) during their affected phase and is ultimately treated by the kohen. However, it is more likely that this confusion arose from the use of the same Greek term for both conditions. The Greeks used the term lepra (λέπρα) for scaly skin conditions. They used the term psora (ψώρα) to describe itchy skin conditions. It became known as Willan's lepra in the late 18th century when English dermatologists Robert Willan and Thomas Bateman differentiated it from other skin diseases. Leprosy, they said, is distinguished by the regular, circular form of patches, while psoriasis is always irregular. Willan identified two categories: leprosa graecorum and psora leprosa.

Psoriasis is thought to have first been described in Ancient Rome by Cornelius Celsus. The British dermatologist Thomas Bateman described a possible link between psoriasis and arthritic symptoms in 1813. Admiral William Halsey missed out on the Battle of Midway because he developed psoriasis while out at sea in the early months of American participation of World War II. Admiral Chester Nimitz medically ordered Halsey to recover at a hospital in Hawaii.

The history of psoriasis is littered with treatments of dubious effectiveness and high toxicity. In the 18th and 19th centuries, Fowler's solution, which contains a poisonous and carcinogenic arsenic compound, was used by dermatologists as a treatment for psoriasis. Mercury was also used for psoriasis treatment during this time. Sulfur, iodine, and phenol were also commonly used treatments for psoriasis during this era, when it was incorrectly believed that psoriasis was an infectious disease. Coal tars were widely used with ultraviolet light irradiation as a topical treatment approach in the early 1900s. During the same time, psoriatic arthritis cases were treated with intravenously administered gold preparations in the same manner as rheumatoid arthritis.

== Society and culture ==
The International Federation of Psoriasis Associations (IFPA) is the global umbrella organization for national and regional psoriasis associations and also gathers the leading experts in psoriasis and psoriatic arthritis research for scientific conferences every three years. The Psoriasis International Network, a program of the Fondation René Touraine, gathers dermatologists, rheumatologists, and other caregivers involved in the management of psoriasis. Non-profit organizations like the National Psoriasis Foundation in the United States, the Psoriasis Association in the United Kingdom, Association France Psoriasis and Psoriasis Australia offer advocacy and education about psoriasis in their respective countries. October 29 is World Psoriasis Day.

=== Cost ===
The annual cost of treating psoriasis in the United States is estimated as high as $32.5 billion, including $12.2 billion in direct costs. Pharmacy costs are the main source of direct expense, with biologic therapy the most prevalent. These costs increase significantly when co-morbid conditions such as heart disease, hypertension, diabetes, lung disease, and psychiatric disorders are factored in. Expenses linked to co-morbidities are estimated at an additional $23,000 per person per year.

== Research ==
The role of insulin resistance in the pathogenesis of psoriasis is under investigation. Preliminary research has suggested that antioxidants such as polyphenols may have beneficial effects on the inflammation characteristic of psoriasis.

Many novel medications being researched during the 2010s target the Th17/IL-23 axis, particularly IL-23p19 inhibitors, as IL-23p19 is present in increased concentrations in psoriasis skin lesions while contributing less to protection against opportunistic infections. Other cytokines such as IL-17 and IL-22 also have been targets for inhibition as they play important roles in the pathogenesis of psoriasis. Another avenue of research has focused on the use of vascular endothelial growth factor inhibitors to treat psoriasis. Oral agents being investigated during the 2010s as alternatives to medications administered by injection include Janus kinase inhibitors, protein kinase C inhibitors, mitogen-activated protein kinase inhibitors, and phosphodiesterase 4 inhibitors, all of which have proven effective in various phase 2 and 3 clinical trials. These agents have potentially severe side-effects due to their immunosuppressive mechanisms.
