= Guttate psoriasis =

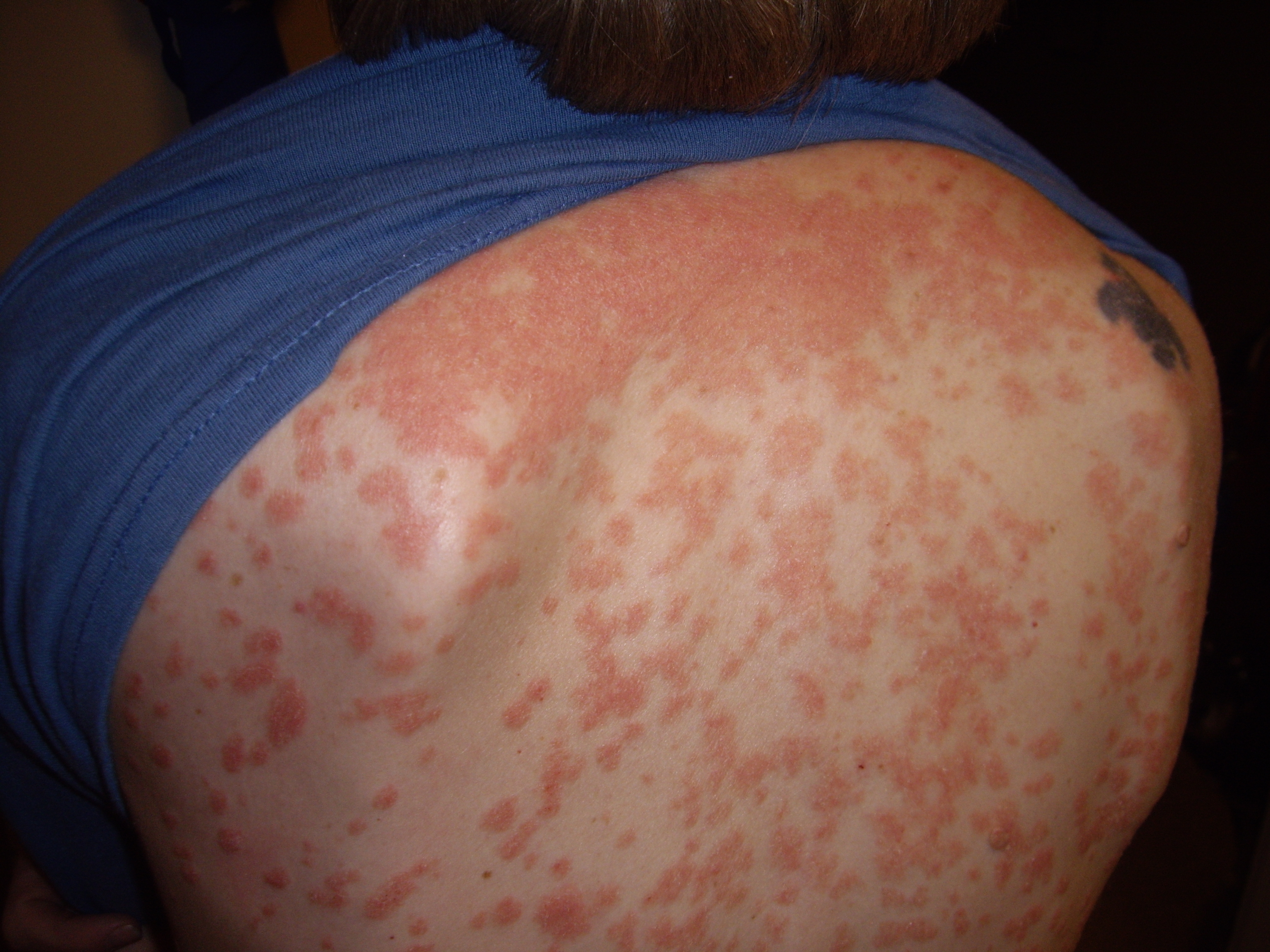
- Back torso lesions, 30-year-old female patient
- Specialty: Dermatology

Guttate psoriasis (also known as eruptive psoriasis) is a type of psoriasis that presents as small (0.5–1.5 cm in diameter) lesions over the upper trunk and proximal extremities; it is found frequently in young adults.

The term "guttate" is used to describe the drop-like appearance of skin lesions. Guttate psoriasis is classically triggered by a bacterial infection, usually an upper respiratory tract infection.

== Signs and symptoms ==
Typically, guttate psoriasis erupts after a throat infection, or strep throat. Initially, when the throat infection has cleared up, the person can feel fine for several weeks before noticing the appearance of red spots. They appear small at first, like a dry red spot which is slightly itchy. When scratched or picked, the top layer of dry skin is removed, leaving dry, red skin beneath with white, dry areas marking where flakes of dry skin stop and start. In the weeks that follow, the spots can grow to as much as an inch in diameter. Some of the larger ones may form a pale area in the center which is slightly yellow.

Guttate psoriasis can occur on any part of the body, particularly the legs, arms, torso, eyelids, back, bottom, bikini line, and neck. The number of lesions can range from 5 to over 100. Generally the parts of the body most affected are the arms, legs, back and torso.

== Causes ==
Genetic and environmental factors can influence the predilection for guttate psoriasis. Human leukocyte antigens, especially those in the HLA-C group are associated with the skin disorder. Beta-hemolytic streptococci infection is the major contributing environmental factor. The typical route of infection is the upper respiratory system. Rarely it is also caused by a skin infection surrounding the anus (perianal streptococcal dermatitis).

== Diagnosis ==
Guttate psoriasis can typically be diagnosed by clinical examination alone.

== Management ==
The treatments used for plaque psoriasis can also be used for guttate psoriasis. Few studies have specifically focused on guttate psoriasis management, so there are currently no firm guidelines for managing guttate psoriasis differently from plaque psoriasis. Immunosuppressive drugs that inhibit T cell activation have been effective in treating severe cases of chronic guttate psoriasis. Due to the role streptococcal infection plays in the development of guttate psoriasis, systemic antibiotics have been considered as a potential treatment option. There is uncertain evidence whether systemic antibiotics or tonsillectomy are effective and safe in treating the disease. The condition often clears up on its own within weeks to months.

Guttate psoriasis tends to follow two patterns of progression: a short-term acute flare-up followed by long-term remission, and a chronic course marked by persistent symptoms without remission. Younger age of onset and strep induced outbreaks have been associated with the acute pattern, while a family history of psoriasis is more common in patients with a chronic course. Researchers have found four factors associated with chronic guttate psoriasis: male sex, multiple disease flares, transition to the vulgaris phenotype, and palmoplantar involvement.

Studies have shown mixed results on the rates of chronic guttate psoriasis. One study conducted in 1982 examined the progression of guttate psoriasis to chronic plaque psoriasis over a 10-year period. This study, which followed a cohort of 15 patients, found only one-third of individuals developed chronic plaque psoriasis. Another study from 2010, with 26 patients, had similar results with 61.1% exhibiting complete/long remission. A retrospective cohort study, spanning from 2009 to 2020, also looked into the long-term outcomes of guttate psoriasis. In this study nearly half of the 120 patients with new-onset guttate psoriasis experienced persistent disease, with some transitioning to the psoriasis vulgaris over time.

== Epidemiology ==
Guttate psoriasis accounts for approximately 2% of psoriasis cases.

== Gallery ==
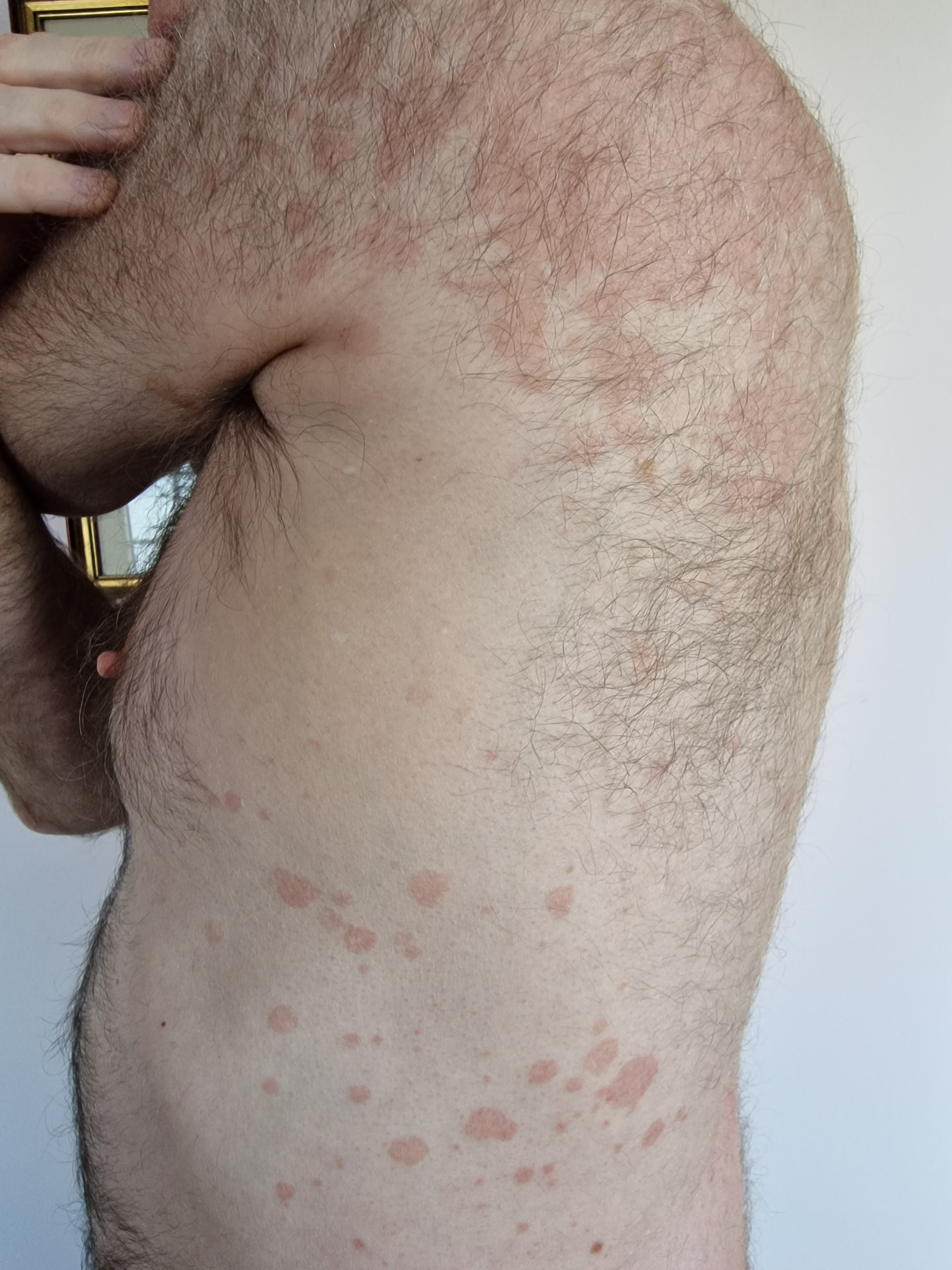
The rash of guttate psoriasis on a 66-year-old male
