= Pustulosis =

Human skin disease

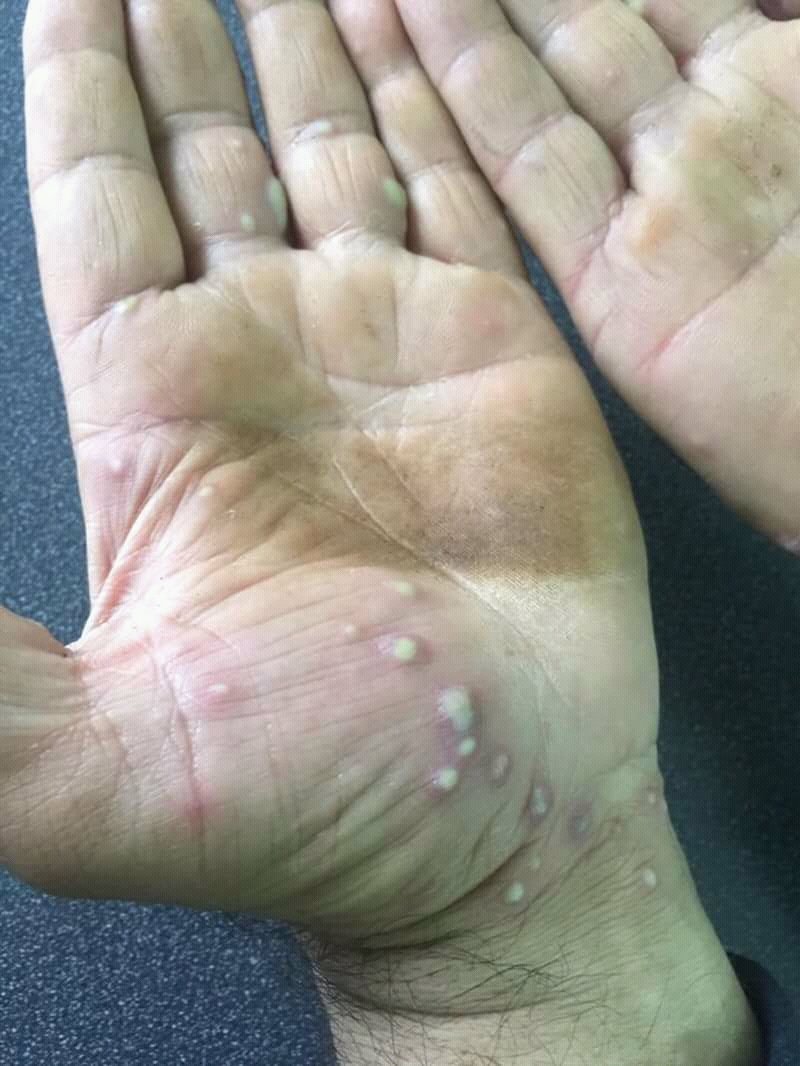

Pustulosis is highly inflammatory skin condition resulting in large fluid-filled blister-like areas - pustules. Pustulosis typically occurs on the palms of the hands and/or the soles of the feet. The skin of these areas peels and flakes (exfoliates). This condition—also referred to as "palmo-plantar pustulosis"—is a feature of pustular psoriasis.

== See also ==
- Acute generalized exanthematous pustulosis
- Pustulosis palmaris et plantaris
