= SAPHO syndrome =

- Other names: Synovitis-acne-pustulosis-hyperostosis-osteitis syndrome
- Specialty: Rheumatology

SAPHO syndrome includes a variety of inflammatory bone disorders that may be associated with skin changes. These diseases share some clinical, radiologic, and pathologic characteristics.

An entity initially known as chronic recurrent multifocal osteomyelitis was first described in 1972. Subsequently, in 1978, several cases of were associated with blisters on the palms and soles (palmoplantar pustulosis). Since then, a number of associations between skin conditions and osteoarticular disorders have been reported under a variety of names, including sternocostoclavicular hyperostosis, pustulotic arthro-osteitis, and acne-associated spondyloarthropathy. The term SAPHO (an acronym for synovitis, arthritis, pustulosis, hyperostosis, osteitis) was coined in 1987 to represent this spectrum of inflammatory bone disorders that may or may not be associated with dermatologic pathology.

== Diagnosis ==
=== Radiologic findings ===
- Anterior chest wall (most common site, 65–90% of patients): Hyperostosis, sclerosis and bone hypertrophy especially involving the sternoclavicular joint, often with a soft tissue component.
- Spine (33% of patients): Segmental, usually involving the thoracic spine. The four main presentations include spondylodiscitis, osteosclerosis, paravertebral ossifications, and sacroiliac joint involvement.
- Long bones (30% of patients): usually metadiaphyseal and located in the distal femur and proximal tibia. It looks like chronic osteomyelitis but will not have a sequestrum or abscess.
- Flat bones (10% of patients): mandible and ilium.

Peripheral arthritis has been reported in 92% of cases of SAPHO as well.

In children, the SAPHO syndrome is most likely to affect the metaphysis of long bones in the legs (tibia, femur, fibula), followed by clavicles and spine.

== Treatment ==
Bisphosphonate therapy has been suggested as a first-line therapeutic option in many case reports and series.

Treatment with tumor necrosis factor alpha antagonists (TNF inhibitors) has been tried in a few patients with limited success. Other drugs that are used in psoriatic arthritis, to which SAPHO syndrome is closely related, have also been used in this condition. They include NSAIDs, corticosteroids, sulfasalazine, methotrexate, ciclosporin and leflunomide.

Some patients have responded to antibiotics. The rationale for their use is that Cutibacterium acnes, a bacterium known for its role in acne, has been isolated from bone biopsies of SAPHO patients.

== See also ==
- PAPA syndrome
- Psoriatic arthritis
- List of cutaneous conditions
