= Photosensitive drug reaction =

- Other names: Drug-induced photosensitivity

Photosensitive drug reaction secondary to medications may cause phototoxic, photoallergic, and lichenoid reactions, and photodistributed telangiectasias, as well as pseudoporphyria.

Drugs involved include naproxen and doxycycline.

== See also ==
- Skin lesion
- List of cutaneous conditions
