= Spongiosis =

Accumulation of fluid in the outermost layer of skin (epidermis)

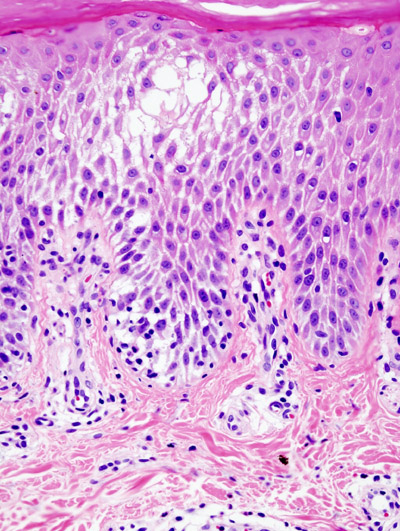
Histopathological image of dyshidrotic dermatitis, showing focal spongiotic change in the epidermis.

Spongiosis is mainly intercellular edema (abnormal accumulation of fluid) in the epidermis, and is characteristic of eczematous dermatitis, manifested clinically by intraepidermal vesicles (fluid-containing spaces), "juicy" papules, and/or lichenification. It is a severe case of eczema that affects the epidermis, dermis or subcutaneous skin tissues. The three types of spongiotic dermatitis are acute, subacute and chronic. A dermatologist can diagnose acute spongiotic dermatitis by examining the skin during an office visit, but a biopsy is needed for an accurate diagnosis of the type.

It can be caused by several internal or external factors, such as food, an insect bite, stress, medication or cosmetics. The treatment varies depending on the type and severity; it is normally treated with topical corticosteroid cream.

== See also ==
- Skin lesion
- Skin disease
- List of skin diseases
