= Parakeratosis =

Mode of keratinization characterized by the retention of nuclei in the stratum corneum

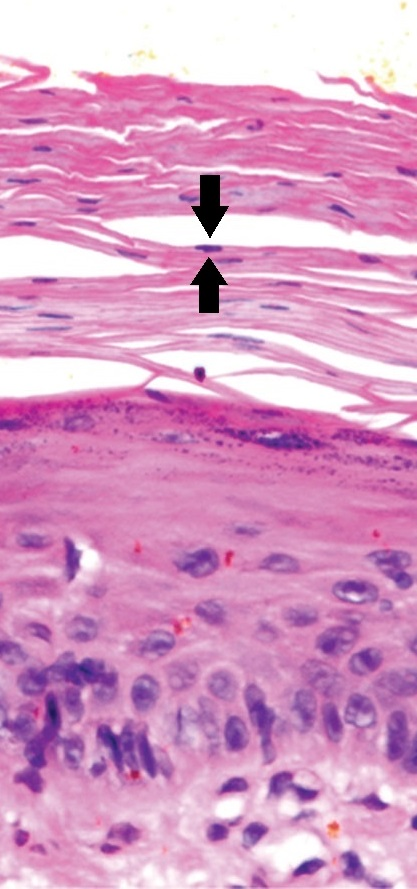
Early actinic keratosis with parakeratosis, with black arrows indicating one of multiple retained nuclei in the stratum corneum

Parakeratosis is a mode of keratinization characterized by the retention of nuclei in the stratum corneum. In mucous membranes, parakeratosis is normal. In the skin, this process leads to the abnormal replacement of annular squames with nucleated cells. Parakeratosis is associated with the thinning or loss of the granular layer and is usually seen in diseases of increased cell turnover, whether inflammatory or neoplastic. Parakeratosis is seen in the plaques of psoriasis and in dandruff.

Granular parakeratosis (originally termed axillary granular parakeratosis) is an idiopathic, benign, nondisabling cutaneous disease that manifests with intertriginous erythematous, brown or red, scaly or keratotic papules and plaques. It presents in all age groups and has no established clinical associations.

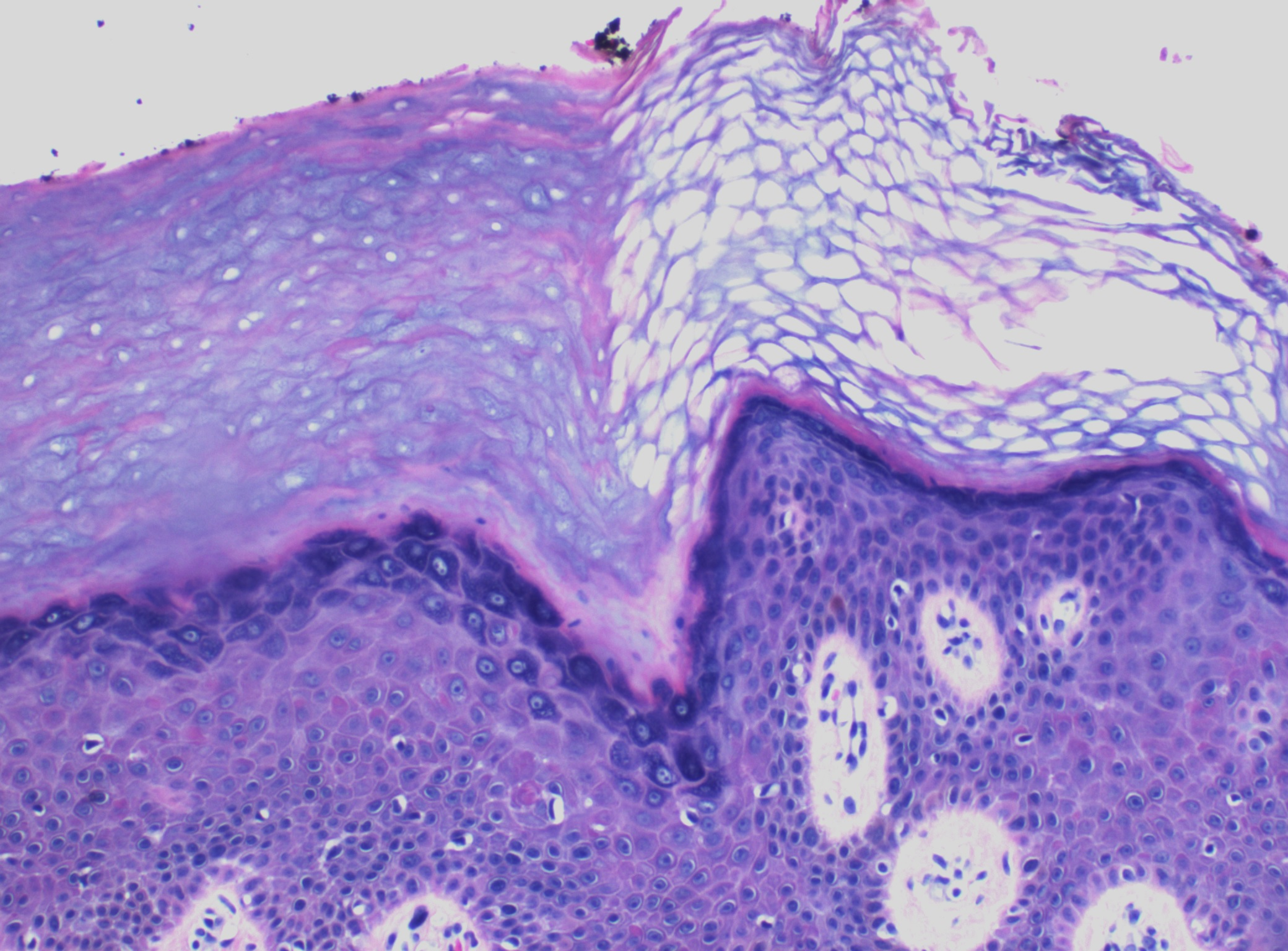
In contrast, hyperkeratosis (pictured) may also show a heterogeneous stratum corneum, but a preserved granular layer is seen.

== See also ==
- Skin lesion
- Skin disease
- List of skin diseases
