= Dermatitis repens =

- Other names: Acrodermatitis continua, acrodermatitis perstans, pustular acrodermatitis, acrodermatitis continua of Hallopeau, acrodermatitis continua suppurativa Hallopeau, Hallopeau's acrodermatitis, Hallopeau's acrodermatitis continua, and dermatitis repens Crocker.
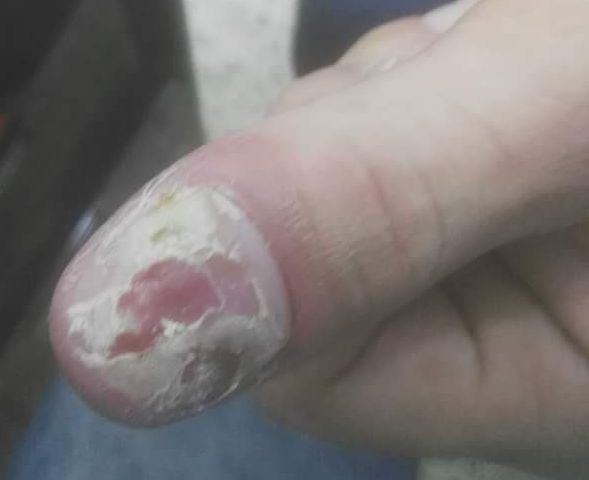
- Specialty: Dermatology

Dermatitis repens, also known as acrodermatitis continua, acrodermatitis perstans, pustular acrodermatitis, acrodermatitis continua of Hallopeau, acrodermatitis continua suppurativa Hallopeau, Hallopeau's acrodermatitis, Hallopeau's acrodermatitis continua, and dermatitis repens Crocker, is a rare, sterile, pustular eruption of the fingers and toes that slowly extends proximally.

== See also ==
- List of cutaneous conditions
- François Henri Hallopeau
- Psoriasis
- Skin lesion
