= Pustulosis palmaris et plantaris =

- Other names: Pustulosis of palms and soles, Palmoplantar pustulosis, Persistent palmoplantar pustulosis, Pustular psoriasis of the Barber type, and Pustular psoriasis of the extremities
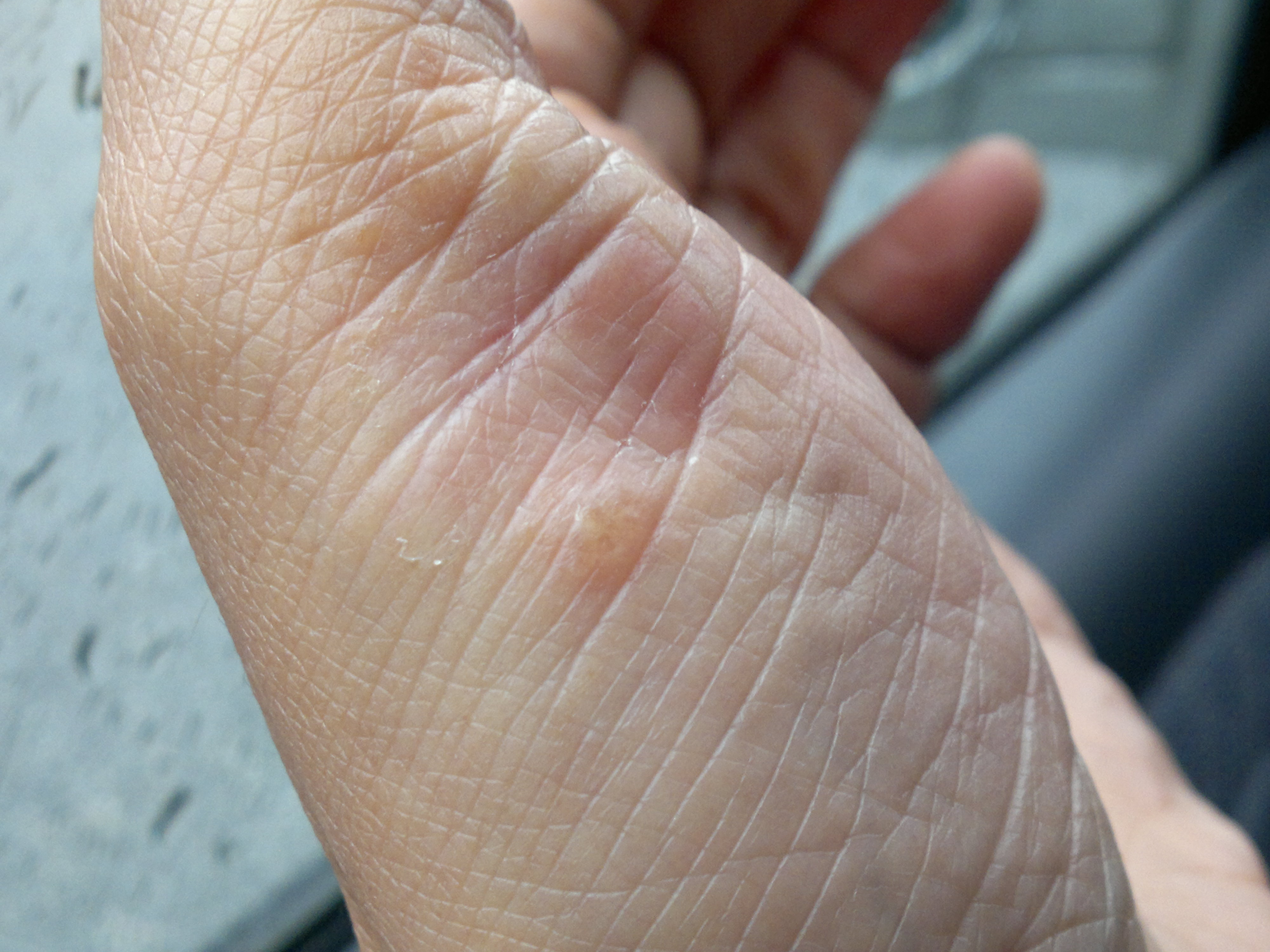
- Pustulosis palmaris et plantaris
- Specialty: Dermatology
- Differential diagnosis: SAPHO syndrome

Pustulosis palmaris et plantaris (PPP) is a chronic recurrent pustular dermatosis (that is, a pustulosis or pustular psoriasis) localized on the palms and soles only, characterized histologically by intraepidermal pustules filled with neutrophils. It can occur as part of the SAPHO syndrome.

== Treatment ==
Systematic reviews show evidence to support the use of systemic retinoids alone and in combination with photochemotherapy to improve symptoms of chronic palmoplantar pustulosis, with a combination more effective than one alone. There is also evidence to support topical steroids under hydrocolloid occlusion dressings, low dose ciclosporin, tetracyclines, and Grenz-Ray Therapy. There is no evidence to support the use of hydroxyurea in chronic palmoplantar pustulosis.

Treatment with guselkumab, an anti–interleukin 23 monoclonal antibody has shown a decrease in the size of the area affected and severity.

== See also ==
- List of cutaneous conditions
