= Genital herpes =

Infection by herpes simplex viruses of the genitals

- Other names: Anogenital herpesviral infection, herpes genitalis
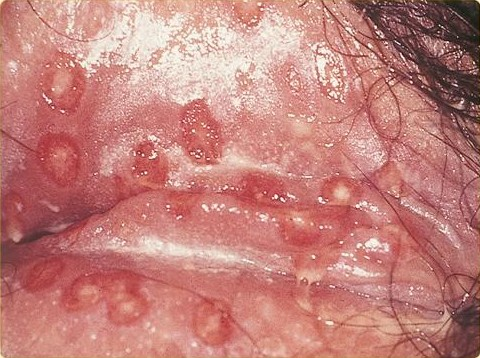
- An outbreak of genital herpes affecting the vulva
- Specialty: Infectious disease
- Symptoms: None, small blisters that break open to form painful ulcers, flu-like symptoms
- Complications: Aseptic meningitis, increased risk of HIV/AIDS if exposed, neonatal herpes
- Usual onset: 2–12 days after exposure
- Duration: Up to 4 weeks (first outbreak)
- Causes: Herpes simplex virus (HSV-1, HSV-2)
- Diagnostic method: Testing lesions, blood tests for antigen
- Differential diagnosis: Syphilis, chancroid, molluscum contagiosum, hidradenitis suppurativa
- Prevention: Not having sex, using condoms, only having sex with someone who is not infected
- Treatment: Antiviral medication
- Frequency: 846 million (2015)

Genital herpes is a herpes infection of the genitals caused by the herpes simplex virus (HSV). Most people either have no or mild symptoms and thus do not know they are infected. When symptoms do occur, they typically include small blisters that break open to form painful ulcers. Flu-like symptoms, such as fever, aching, or swollen lymph nodes, may also occur. Onset is typically around 4 days after exposure with symptoms lasting up to 4 weeks. Once infected further outbreaks may occur but are generally milder.

The disease is typically spread by direct genital contact with the skin surface or secretions of someone who is infected. This may occur during sex, including anal, oral, and manual sex. Sores are not required for transmission to occur. The risk of spread between a couple is about 7.5% over a year. HSV is classified into two types, HSV-1 and HSV-2. While historically HSV-2 was more common, genital HSV-1 has become more common in the developed world. Diagnosis may occur by testing lesions using either PCR or viral culture or blood tests for specific antibodies.

Efforts to prevent infection include not having sex, using condoms, and only having sex with someone who is not infected. Once infected, there is no cure. Antiviral medications may, however, prevent outbreaks or shorten outbreaks if they occur. The long-term use of antivirals may also decrease the risk of further spread.

In 2015, about 846 million people (12% of the world population) had genital herpes. In the United States, more than one in six people (17%) between the ages of 14 and 49 have the disease. Women are more commonly infected than men. Rates of disease caused by HSV-2 have decreased in the United States between 1990 and 2010.

There was a 51.97% global increase in cases of genital herpes between 1990 and 2021. Prevalence increased in South Asia, Southern Sub-Saharan Africa and Central Europe. People aged between 15 and 49, in Southern Sub-Saharan Africa experienced the highest incidence rates of these regions.

Complications may rarely include aseptic meningitis, an increased risk of HIV/AIDS if exposed to HIV-positive individuals, and spread to the baby during childbirth resulting in neonatal herpes.

== Signs and symptoms ==
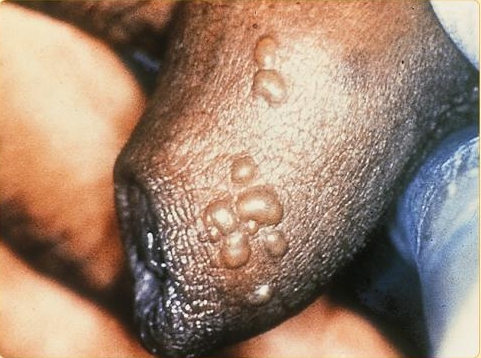
Genital herpes affecting the penis

In males, the lesions occur on the glans penis, shaft of the penis or other parts of the genital region, on the inner thigh, buttocks, or anus. In females, lesions appear on or near the pubis, clitoris or other parts of the vulva, buttocks or anus.

Other common symptoms include pain, itching, and burning. Less frequent, yet still common, symptoms include discharge from the penis or vagina, fever, headache, muscle pain (myalgia), swollen and enlarged lymph nodes and malaise. Women often experience additional symptoms that include painful urination (dysuria) and cervicitis. Herpetic proctitis (inflammation of the anus and rectum) is common for individuals participating in anal intercourse.

After 2–3 weeks, existing lesions progress into ulcers and then crust and heal, although lesions on mucosal surfaces may never form crusts. In rare cases, involvement of the sacral region of the spinal cord can cause acute urinary retention and one-sided symptoms and signs of myeloradiculitis (a combination of myelitis and radiculitis): pain, sensory loss, abnormal sensations (paresthesia) and rash. Historically, this has been termed Elsberg syndrome, although this entity is not clearly defined.

=== Recurrence ===
After a first episode of herpes genitalis caused by HSV-2, there will be at least one recurrence in approximately 80% of people, while the recurrence rate for herpes genitalis caused by HSV-1 is approximately 50%. Herpes genitalis caused by HSV-2 recurs on average four to six times per year, while that of HSV-1 infection occurs only about once per year.

People with recurrent genital herpes may be treated with suppressive therapy, which consists of daily antiviral treatment using acyclovir, valacyclovir or famciclovir. Suppressive therapy may be useful in those who have at least four recurrences per year but the quality of the evidence is poor. People with lower rates of recurrence will probably also have fewer recurrences with suppressive therapy. Suppressive therapy should be discontinued after a maximum of one year to reassess recurrence frequency.

== Transmission ==
Genital herpes can be spread by viral shedding prior to and following the formation of ulcers. The risk of spread between a couple is about 7.5% over a year (for unprotected sex). The likelihood of transferring genital herpes from one person to another is decreased by external condom use by 50%, by internal condom by 50%, and refraining from sex during an active outbreak. The longer a partner has had the infection, the lower the transmission rate. An infected person may further decrease transmission risks by maintaining a daily dose of antiviral medications. Infection by genital herpes occurs in about 1 in every 1,000 sexual acts.

== Prevention ==
Because herpes simplex virus (HSV) infection is common and not routinely screened for in the general population, complete prevention of the transmission of genital herpes is difficult. To reduce the chance of contracting herpes simplex virus, external condoms for the penis may be used during oral sex, vaginal sex, and anal sex. Internal condoms for the vagina may be used during oral sex or vaginal sex. Internal condoms and external condoms should not be used simultaneously. Dental dams may be used during oral sex involving the vagina or anus. Decreasing the number of sexual partners a person has may also decrease the chance of contracting HSV. People who have sexual relations with others may get tested for HSV. In people who have been diagnosed with genital herpes, transmission to others may be prevented through suppressive antiviral drugs. This option is 90% effective in preventing the transmission of HSV and is a commonly used option for sexual and/or romantic partners or those who plan on becoming pregnant. Those who are aware that they have genital herpes should notify their partner(s).

== Screening and diagnosis ==
Genital herpes may be suspected on physical examination, but when genital lesions are present, the diagnosis should be confirmed by testing a swab from a blister or ulcer. Nucleic acid amplification tests (NAATs), including polymerase chain reaction (PCR), are the most sensitive tests for detecting herpes simplex virus (HSV) in these samples; viral culture is an alternative but is less sensitive, particularly as lesions heal. Type-specific blood tests for HSV antibodies may help in selected circumstances, such as recurrent symptoms with negative lesion testing or having a sexual partner with genital herpes. Routine screening of the general asymptomatic population is not recommended.

Herpes simplex cytopathic effects on a cervical Pap test: multinucleation, nuclear molding, chromatin margination, and a probable Cowdry type A inclusion. Accompanying neutrophils are common but nonspecific. Cytology does not replace virologic testing.

False negative test results may occur if the test is performed late in the course of the illness or if the test sample is not appropriately acquired. Testing people for HSV when they are asymptomatic is not recommended due to the high false-positivity rate. A false positive test may cause relationship difficulties.

== Genital herpes and pregnancy ==
Women who have genital herpes before pregnancy have a very low risk of transmitting herpes simplex virus to the baby during delivery. In the United States, 20-25% of pregnant women have genital herpes; however, fewer than 0.1% of babies born get neonatal herpes during delivery.

Per the U.S. Preventive Services Task Force, routine screening for pregnant women without a history of genital herpes is not recommended. Serologic (blood) antibody testing in asymptomatic patients without history has been shown to frequently have false positive and false negative test results which may lead to anxiety, labeling, or false reassurance with minimal improvements in health outcomes of reducing neonatal herpes transmission.

Pregnant women should notify their doctor if they show symptoms of genital herpes. At the time of delivery, women should be physically examined for signs of genital herpes. If a pregnant woman is symptomatic during delivery, a Cesarean section is the safest method of preventing contact and transmission of herpes simplex virus between the mother and the baby. Alternatively, some physicians use the drug acyclovir to treat pregnant women with genital herpes at 36 weeks until delivery to prevent the recurrence of symptoms and reduce the risk of transmission during delivery. Acyclovir is not approved for this purpose by the FDA; however, acyclovir's manufacturer has tracked pregnant women who have taken the drug during pregnancy, and there is no evidence that shows any risks for the infant.

Acyclovir may help reduce the frequency of symptomatic recurrence near term but may not definitively protect against transmission in all cases. This may be favorable particularly for women who prefer to have a vaginal delivery instead of cesarean section.

== Treatment ==
There is no cure for the disease. Skin lesions disappear without treatment within a few weeks, but treatment accelerates the healing of lesions, reduces symptoms, and helps prevent or reduce recurrent outbreaks of the disease. Antiviral medications provide clinical benefits to those who are symptomatic and is the primary means of management once infected. The main goal for the use of antiviral medications is to treat the first outbreak or to prevent genital herpes recurrences, improve quality of life, and help suppress the virus to sexual transmission to partners. Three FDA-approved antiviral medications have clinical benefits in controlling the signs and symptoms of genital herpes when used for first clinical symptoms and recurrent episodes or when used as daily suppressive therapy. These medications are acyclovir, valacyclovir, and famciclovir and have been shown to be safe with long-term use.

Acyclovir is an antiviral medication and reduces the pain and the number of lesions in the initial case of genital herpes. Furthermore, it decreases the frequency and severity of recurrent infections. It comes in capsules, tablets, and ointment. However, topical ointment with acyclovir is discouraged since it offers minimal clinical benefits.

Valacyclovir is a prodrug that is converted to acyclovir once in the body. It helps relieve the pain and discomfort and speeds healing of sores. It only comes in caplets and its advantage is that it has a longer duration of action than acyclovir.

Famciclovir is another antiviral drug that belongs to the same class. Famciclovir is a prodrug that is converted to penciclovir in the body. The latter is the one active against the viruses. It has a longer duration of action than acyclovir and it only comes in tablets.

=== First clinical episode of genital herpes ===
The first time an individual experiences genital herpes, they may have prolonged clinical illness with severe genital ulceration. Furthermore, those who have mild clinical symptoms initially may experience severe recurrent infections later. Typical recommended regimens for first clinical episodes of genital herpes may be something like:

Acyclovir 400 mg orally 3 times per day for 7–10 days or
Famciclovir 1g orally 3 times per day for 7–10 days or
Valacyclovir 1g orally 2 times per day for 7–10 days

A treatment longer than 10 days may be recommended if the genital ulcers have not fully healed.

=== Recurrent genital herpes ===
Most individuals who experience a symptomatic first episode of genital herpes will experience recurrence of genital lesions at some point in the future. Asymptomatic shedding can also occur where an individual may not have genital ulcerations present but still possibly transmit the virus to other partners. It is important for patients to have a discussion with their primary care doctor for options of receiving either episodic treatment or long-term suppressive therapies.

=== Suppressive therapy for recurrent genital herpes ===
Suppressive therapy has been shown effective in reducing recurrent genital herpes in as high as 80% which can tremendously help in improving quality of life since patients claim having minimal symptomatic episodes. Long-term use of anti-virals like acyclovir, valacyclovir, and famciclovir have been shown to be safe and effective. Furthermore, long-term treatment of genital herpes with valacyclovir daily has shown to decrease the rates of transmission. It is important for patients to continue suppressive therapy in conjunction to consistent condom use and sexual abstinence during recurrent episodes to decrease transmission as well.

=== Over-the-counter and non-drug treatments ===
To decrease symptoms during an outbreak of genital herpes, people can use an ice pack on the affected areas, take a warm bath, keep the genitals dry when not bathing, and take over-the-counter pain relief medication such as ibuprofen or acetaminophen.

== Epidemiology ==
About 16 percent of Americans between the ages of 14 and 49 are infected with genital herpes, making it one of the most common sexually transmitted infections. More than 85% of those with HSV-2 are unaware of their infection. Approximately 776,000 people in the United States get new herpes infections every year.

Tests for herpes are not routinely included among STI screenings. Performers in the pornography industry are screened for HIV, chlamydia, and gonorrhea with an optional panel of tests for hepatitis B, hepatitis C and syphilis, but not herpes. Testing for herpes is controversial since the results are not always accurate or helpful. Most sex workers and performers will contract herpes at some point in their careers whether they use protection or not.

== History ==
Early 20th century public health legislation in the United Kingdom required compulsory treatment for sexually transmitted infections but did not include herpes because it was not serious enough. As late as 1975, nursing textbooks did not include herpes as it was considered no worse than a common cold. After the development of acyclovir in the 1970s, the drug company Burroughs Wellcome launched an extensive marketing campaign that publicized the illness, including creating victim's support groups.

Modern humans likely became susceptible to HSV-2 due to P. boisei, who contracted the disease by consuming infected chimp meat; which then passed on to Homo erectus the same way. An infection of cold sores (HSV-1), may have provided an initial layer of protection from HSV-2, until the disease "adapted to a different mucosal niche".

== Research ==
There are efforts to develop a vaccine for active outbreaks of the virus—despite most cases being asymptomatic—but the results thus far have not been able to do so or eliminate transmission.
