= Neonatal pustular eruption =

Group of infant skin diseases

Neonatal pustular eruptions are a group of disorders characterized by various forms of pustulosis (rashes consisting at least in part of pustules) seen in the first four weeks of life.

This grouping can help aid in differential diagnosis.

Neonatal pustular eruptions can be further divided into noninfectious and infectious causes, and range from benign to life-threatening. In at least some populations, the infectious causes are more common.

== Non-infectious causes ==
The non-infectious causes are generally benign and self-limited.

- Erythema toxicum neonatorum
- Transient neonatal pustular melanosis
- Miliaria pustulosa
- Infantile acropustulosis
- Eosinophilic pustular folliculitis
- Acne neonatorum (neonatal acne)
- Benign neonatal cephalic pustulosis (also called neonatal malasezzia furfur pustulosis)
- Infantile generalized pustular psoriasis
- The pustular eruption associated with transient myeloproliferative disease
- Incontinentia pigmenti
- Sucking blisters - blisters on the hands of newborns due to sucking
- Aplasia cutis congenita

== Infectious causes ==
=== Bacteria ===
Most commonly these are primary cutaneous infections, caused by Staphylococcus aureus or beta-hemolytic streptococci. This would be called bullous impetigo. When more severe, these cutaneous infections would develop into furuncles (infections run deeper into the skin).

Congenital syphilis is another bacterial infection of the skin that can cause pustules in the neonatal period.

Listeriosis

=== Virus ===
- Herpes simplex virus infection
- Varicella

=== Fungal ===
- Congenital candidiasis - Congenital candidiasis results due to intrauterine candidal infection of fetus.
- Neonatal candidiasis - It is perinatally acquired candidal infection, manifesting after the sixth day of life.
- Malassezia furfur, which causes benign neonatal cephalic pustulosis, also called neonatal malasezzia furfur pustulosis.
