= Vertically transmitted infection =

Infection caused by pathogens that use mother-to-children transmission

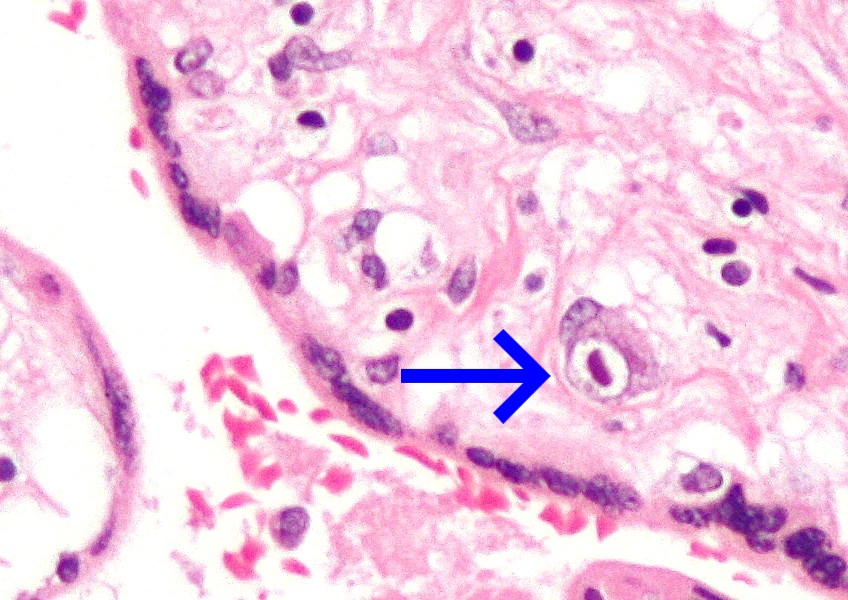
- Micrograph of cytomegalovirus (CMV) infection of the placenta (CMV placentitis), a vertically transmitted infection: The characteristic large nucleus of a CMV-infected cell is seen off-centre at the bottom right of the image, H&E stain.
- Specialty: Pediatrics

A vertically transmitted infection is an infection caused by pathogenic bacteria or viruses that use mother-to-child transmission, that is, transmission directly from the mother to an embryo, fetus, or baby during pregnancy or childbirth. It can occur when the mother has a pre-existing disease or becomes infected during pregnancy. Nutritional deficiencies may exacerbate the risks of perinatal infections. Vertical transmission is important for the mathematical modelling of infectious diseases, especially for diseases of animals with large litter sizes, as it causes a wave of new infectious individuals.

== Types of infections ==
Bacteria, viruses, and other organisms can be passed from mother to child. Several vertically transmitted infections are included in the group known as TORCH complex:

1. T – toxoplasmosis from Toxoplasma gondii
2. O – other infections (see below)
3. R – rubella
4. C – cytomegalovirus
5. H – herpes simplex virus-2 or neonatal herpes simplex

Other infections include:

- Parvovirus B19, a small DNA virus from the family Parvoviridae which causes disease mainly in infants, although it also affects adults. It is the classic cause of the childhood rash called fifth disease or erythema infectiosum, or "slapped face syndrome".
- Coxsackievirus, RNA virus belonging to the family Picornaviridae. It is one of the most common and important human pathogens, transmitted by the fecal–oral route.
- Chickenpox. Highly contagious caused by varicella zoster virus. Causes a disease which results in a characteristic skin rash that forms small, itchy blisters, which eventually scab over.
- Chlamydia which is a sexually transmitted infection caused by the bacterium Chlamydia trachomatis.
- HIV. Lentivirus infecting humans, causing acquired immunodeficiency syndrome (AIDS). Leading to a progressive failure of the immune system and allowing life-threatening opportunistic infections and cancers to thrive.
- Human T-lymphotropic virus
- Syphilis
- Zika fever, caused by Zika virus, can cause microcephaly and other brain defects in the child.
- COVID-19 in pregnancy is associated with an increased risk of stillbirth with an odds ratio of approximately 2.

Hepatitis B may also be classified as a vertically transmitted infection. The hepatitis B virus is large and does not cross the placenta. Hence, it cannot infect the fetus unless breaks in the maternal-fetal barrier have occurred, but such breaks can occur in bleeding during childbirth or amniocentesis.

The TORCH complex was originally considered to consist of the four conditions mentioned above, with the "TO" referring to Toxoplasma. The four-term form is still used in many modern references, and the capitalization "ToRCH" is sometimes used in these contexts. The acronym has also been listed as TORCHES, for TOxoplasmosis, Rubella, Cytomegalovirus, HErpes simplex, and Syphilis.

A further expansion of this acronym, CHEAPTORCHES, was proposed by Ford-Jones and Kellner in 1995:

- C – chickenpox and shingles
- H – hepatitis, C (D), E
- E – enteroviruses
- A – AIDS (HIV infection)
- P – parvovirus B19 (produces hydrops fetalis secondary to aplastic anemia)
- T – toxoplasmosis
- O – other (group B streptococci, Listeria, Candida, and Lyme disease)
- R – rubella
- C – cytomegalovirus
- H – herpes simplex
- E – everything else sexually transmitted (gonorrhea, Chlamydia infection, Ureaplasma urealyticum, and human papillomavirus)
- S – Syphilis

== Signs and symptoms ==
The signs and symptoms of a vertically transmitted infection depend on the individual pathogen. In the mother, it may cause subtle signs such as an influenza-like illness, or possibly no symptoms at all. In such cases, the effects may be seen first at birth.

Signs and symptoms of a vertically transmitted infection may include fever and flu-like symptoms. The newborn is often small for gestational age. A petechial rash on the skin may be present, with small reddish or purplish spots due to bleeding from capillaries under the skin. An enlarged liver and spleen (hepatosplenomegaly) is common, as is jaundice. However, jaundice is less common in hepatitis B because a newborn's immune system is not developed well enough to mount a response against liver cells, as would normally be the cause of jaundice in an older child or adult. Hearing impairment, eye problems, mental retardation, autism, and death can be caused by vertically transmitted infections.

The genetic conditions of Aicardi-Goutieres syndrome are possibly present in a similar manner.

== Causal routes ==
The main routes of transmission of vertically transmitted infections are across the placenta (transplacental) and across the female reproductive tract during childbirth. Transmission is also possible by breaks in the maternal-fetal barrier, such as by amniocentesis or major trauma.

=== Transplacental ===
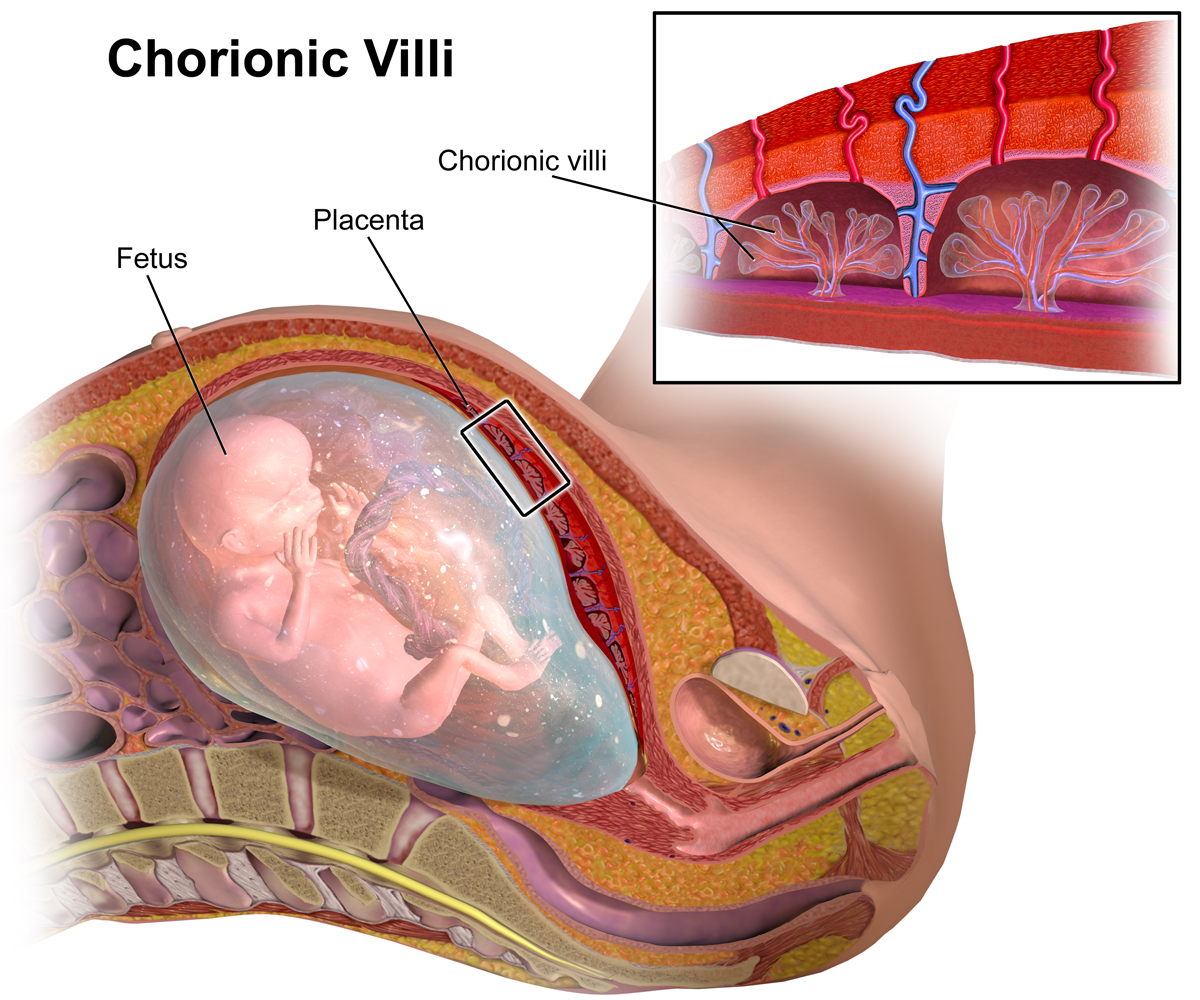
The Placenta with chorionic villi.

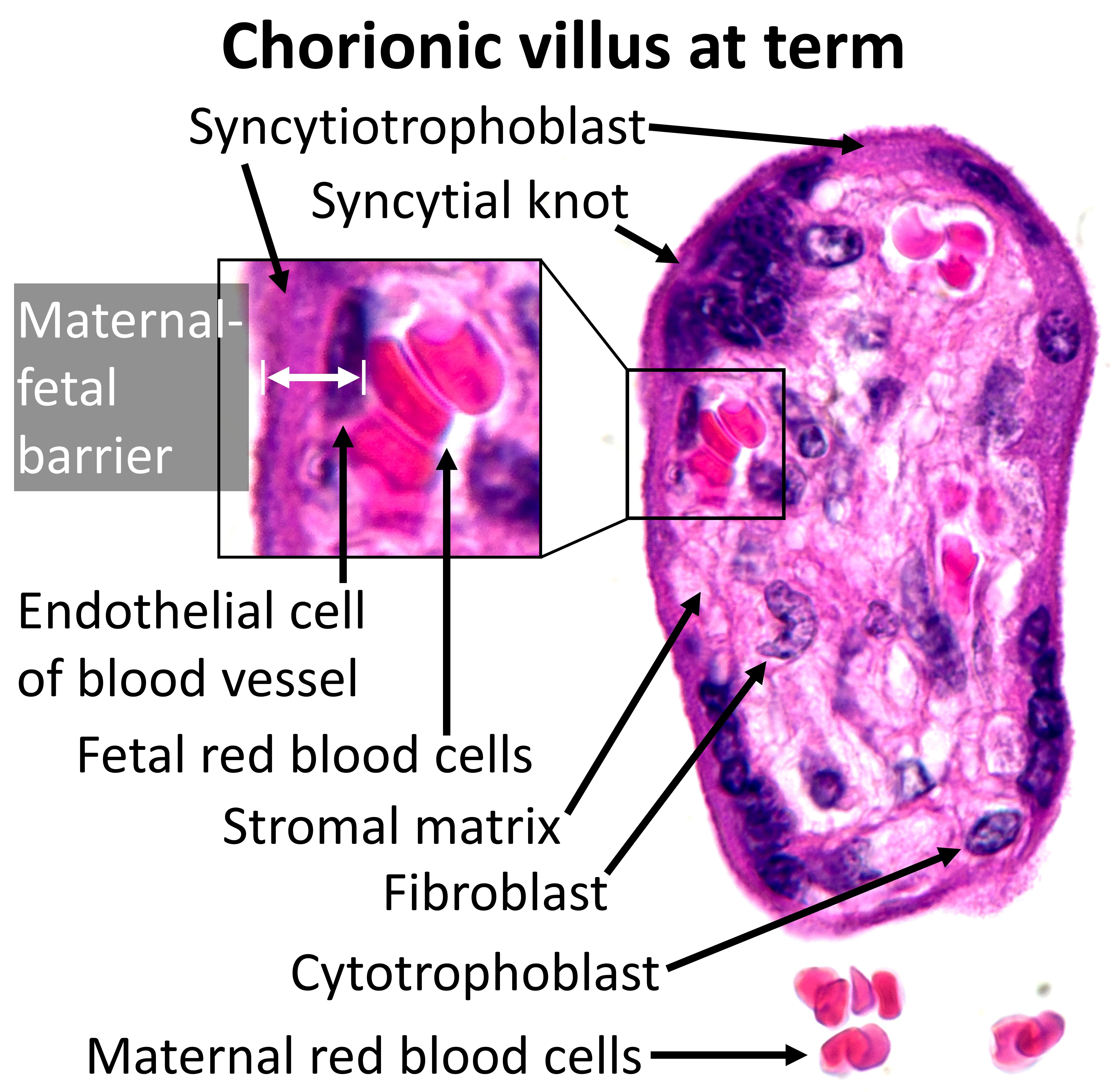
High-magnification H&E micrograph of a chorionic villus of the placenta at term with main cell types. Insert shows the maternal-fetal barrier that mainly consists of syncytiotrophoblast and endothelial cells, keeping fetal blood separate from the surrounding maternal blood while letting oxygen and nutrients pass through. This is the barrier that is crossed in transplacentally transmitted infections.

The embryo and fetus have little or no immune function. They depend on the mother's immune function. Several pathogens can cross the placenta and cause perinatal infection. Often, microorganisms that cause minor illnesses in the mother are very dangerous for the developing embryo or fetus. This can result in spontaneous abortion or major developmental disorders. For many infections, the baby is more at risk at particular stages of pregnancy. Problems related to perinatal infection are not always directly noticeable.

Apart from infecting the fetus, transplacental pathogens may cause placentitis (inflammation of the placenta) and/or chorioamnionitis (inflammation of the fetal membranes).

=== During childbirth ===
Babies can also become infected by their mothers during birth. Some infectious agents may be transmitted to the embryo or fetus in the uterus, while passing through the birth canal, or even shortly after birth. The distinction is important because when transmission is primarily during or after birth, medical intervention can help prevent infections in the infant.During birth, babies are exposed to maternal blood, body fluids, and to the maternal genital tract without the placental barrier intervening. Because of this, blood-borne microorganisms (hepatitis B, HIV), organisms associated with sexually transmitted infections (e.g., Neisseria gonorrhoeae and Chlamydia trachomatis), and normal fauna of the genitourinary tract (e.g., Candida albicans) are among those commonly seen in infection of newborns.

== Pathophysiology ==
=== Virulence versus symbiosis ===
In the spectrum of optimal virulence, vertical transmission tends to evolve benign symbiosis, so it is a critical concept for evolutionary medicine. Because a pathogen's ability to pass from mother to child depends significantly on the host's ability to reproduce, pathogens' transmissibility tends to be inversely related to their virulence. In other words, as pathogens become more harmful to, and thus decrease the reproduction rate of, their host organism, they are less likely to be passed on to the hosts' offspring since they will have fewer offspring.

Although HIV is sometimes transmitted through perinatal transmission, its virulence can be accounted for because its primary mode of transmission is not vertical. Moreover, medicine has further decreased the frequency of vertical transmission of HIV. The incidence of perinatal HIV cases in the United States has declined as a result of the implementation of recommendations on HIV counselling and voluntary testing practices and the use of zidovudine therapy by providers to reduce perinatal HIV transmission.

The price paid in the evolution of symbiosis is, however, great: for many generations, almost all cases of vertical transmission remain pathological—in particular if any other routes of transmission exist. Many generations of random mutation and selection are needed to evolve symbiosis. During this time, the vast majority of vertical transmission cases exhibit the initial virulence.

In dual inheritance theory, vertical transmission refers to the passing of cultural traits from parents to children.

== Diagnosis ==
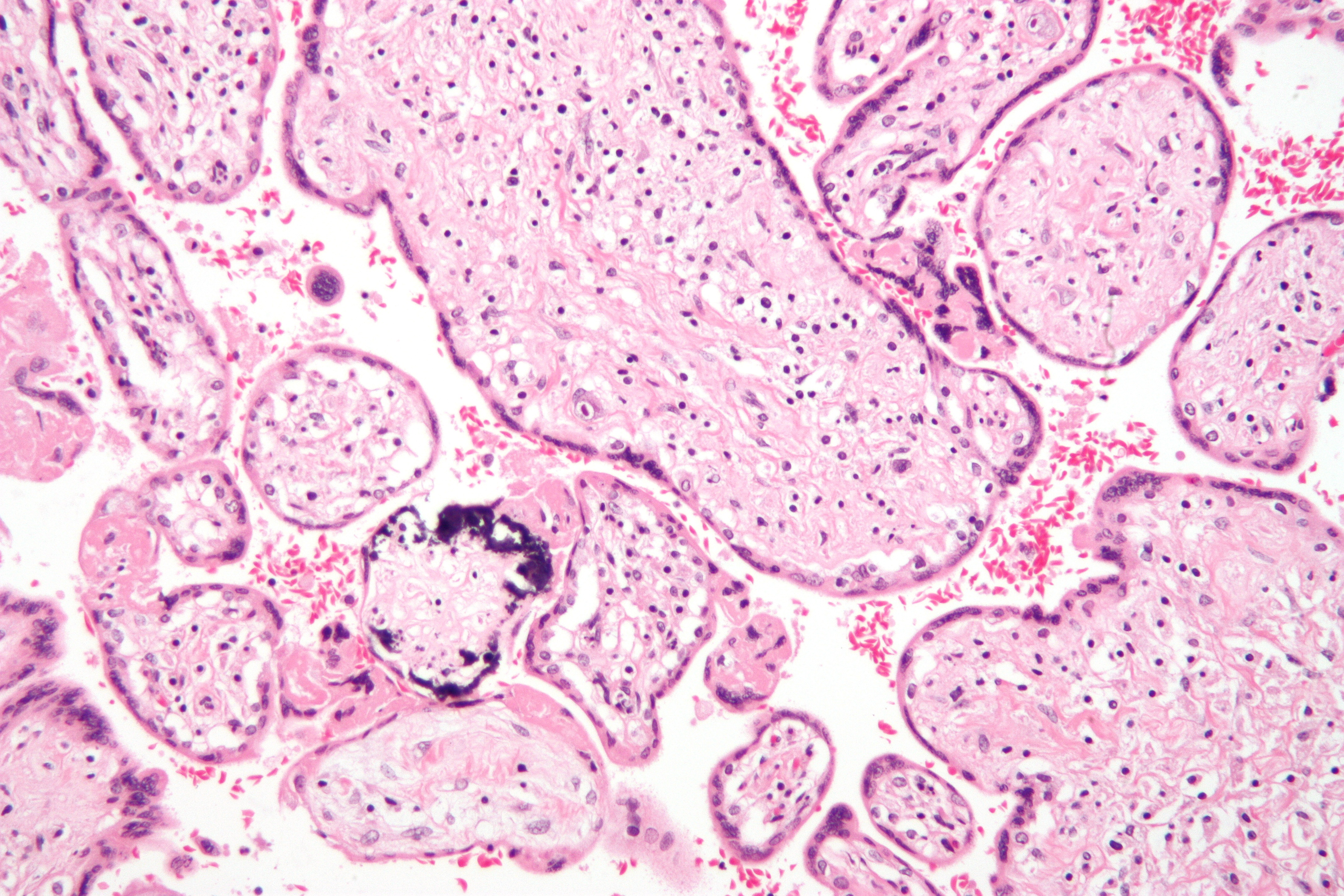
CMV placentitis

When physical examination of the newborn shows signs of a vertically transmitted infection, the examiner may test blood, urine, and spinal fluid for evidence of the infections listed above. Diagnosis can be confirmed by culture of one of the specific pathogens or by increased levels of IgM against the pathogen.

=== Classification ===
A vertically transmitted infection can be called a perinatal infection if it is transmitted in the perinatal period, which starts at gestational ages between 22 and 28 weeks (with regional variations in the definition) and ending seven completed days after birth.

The term congenital infection can be used if the vertically transmitted infection persists after childbirth.

== Treatment ==
Micrograph of the cytopathic effects of herpes simplex on a cervical Pap test (Pap stain): multinucleation, nuclear molding, chromatin margination, and a Cowdry type A inclusion. Accompanying neutrophils are common but nonspecific.

Some vertically transmitted infections, such as toxoplasmosis and syphilis, can be effectively treated with antibiotics if the mother is diagnosed early in her pregnancy. Many viral vertically transmitted infections have no effective treatment, but some, notably rubella and varicella-zoster, can be prevented by vaccinating the mother before pregnancy.

Pregnant women living in malaria-endemic areas are candidates for malaria prophylaxis. It clinically improves the anemia and parasitemia of the pregnant women, and birthweight in their infants.

If the mother has active herpes simplex (as may be suggested by a pap test), delivery by Caesarean section can prevent the newborn from contact, and consequent infection, with this virus.

IgG_{2} antibody may play a crucial role in preventing intrauterine infections, and extensive research is ongoing to develop IgG_{2}-based therapies for treatment and vaccination.

== Prognosis ==
Each type of vertically transmitted infection has a different prognosis. The stage of pregnancy at the time of infection can also change the impact on the newborn.

== See also ==
- Group B streptococcal infection
- Susceptibility and severity of infections in pregnancy
- Horizontal disease transmission
- TORCH syndrome
- Congenital cytomegalovirus infection
- Congenital rubella syndrome
- Congenital syphilis
- Neonatal herpes simplex
- Endogenization
