= TORCH syndrome =

Syndrome caused by a group of congenital infections

- Other names: TORCH infection
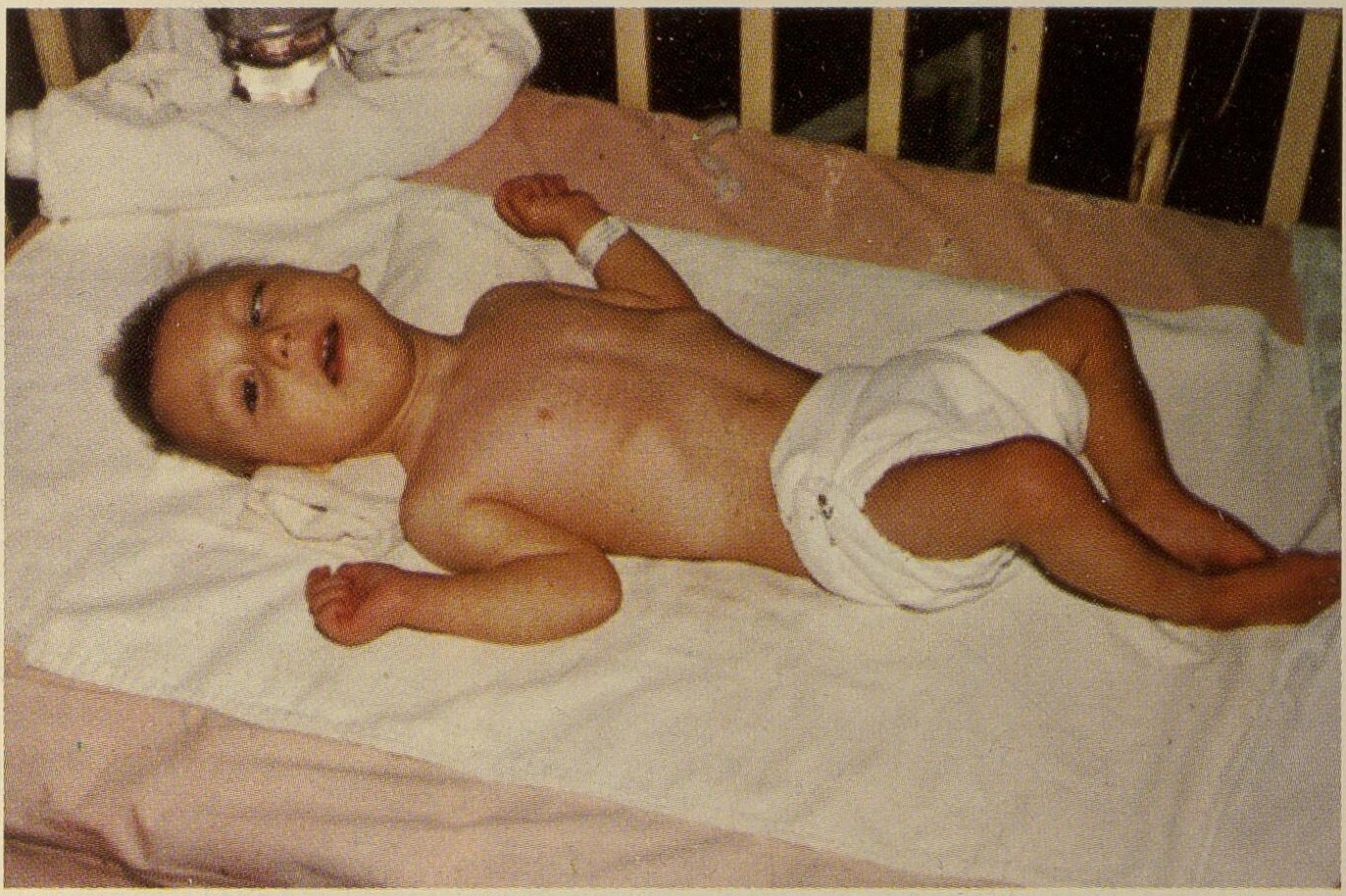
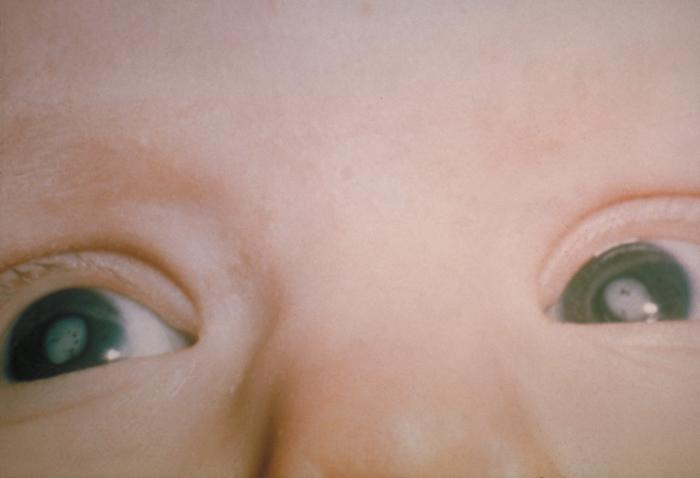
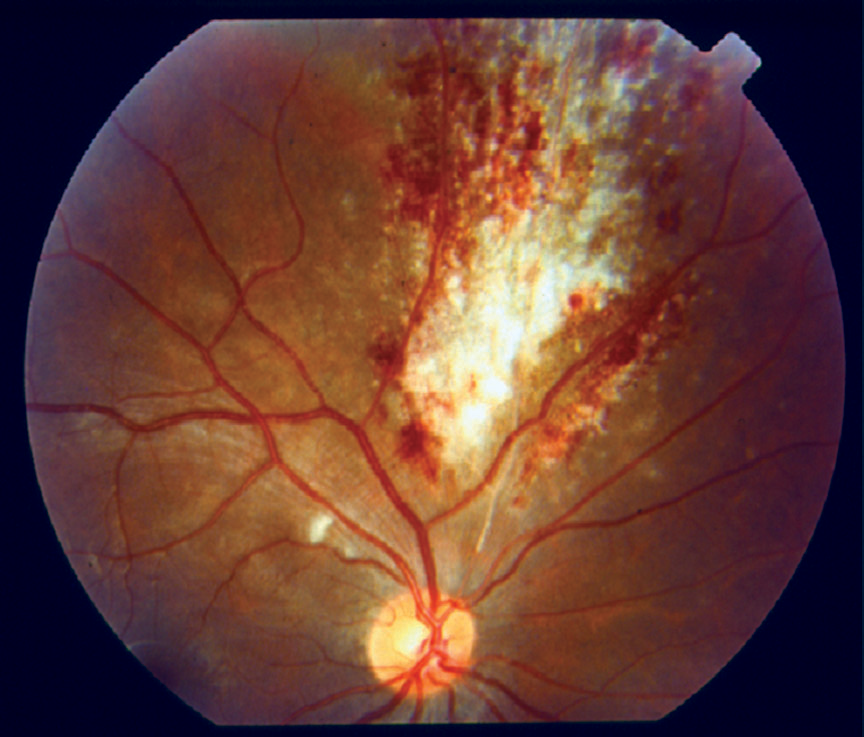
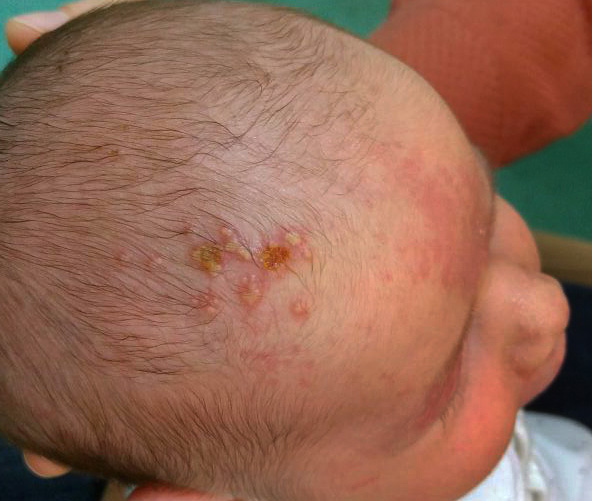
- Congenital toxoplasmosis CRS cataracts caused by rubella Retinitis caused by cytomegalovirus Neonatal herpes
- Different manifestations of the four classical TORCH infections
- Specialty: Neonatology, infectious disease
- Symptoms: hepatosplenomegaly, fever, lethargy, difficulty feeding, anemia, petechiae, purpurae, jaundice, and chorioretinitis
- Complications: Stillbirth, etc.
- Treatment: Mainly supportive

TORCH syndrome is a cluster of symptoms caused by congenital infection with toxoplasmosis, rubella, cytomegalovirus, herpes simplex, and other organisms including syphilis, parvovirus, and Varicella zoster. Zika virus is considered the most recent member of TORCH infections.

TORCH is an acronym for (T)oxoplasmosis, (O)ther Agents, (R)ubella, (C)ytomegalovirus, and (H)erpes Simplex.

== Signs and symptoms ==
Though caused by different infections, the signs and symptoms of TORCH syndrome are consistent. They include hepatosplenomegaly (enlargement of the liver and spleen), fever, lethargy, difficulty feeding, anemia, petechiae, purpurae, jaundice, and chorioretinitis. The specific infection may cause additional symptoms.

TORCH syndrome may develop before birth, causing stillbirth, in the neonatal period, or later in life.

== Pathophysiology ==
TORCH syndrome is caused by in-utero infection with one of the TORCH agents, disrupting fetal development.

== Diagnosis ==
Presence of IgM is diagnostic and persistence of IgG beyond 6–9 months is diagnostic.

== Prevention ==
TORCH syndrome can be prevented by treating an infected pregnant woman, thereby preventing the infection from affecting the fetus.

== Treatment ==
The treatment of TORCH syndrome is mainly supportive and depends on the symptoms present; medication is an option for herpes and cytomegalovirus infections.

== Epidemiology ==
Developing countries are more severely affected by TORCH syndrome than developed countries.
