= Neonatal acne =

- Other names: Acne infantum, acne neonatorum, and neonatal cephalic pustulosis
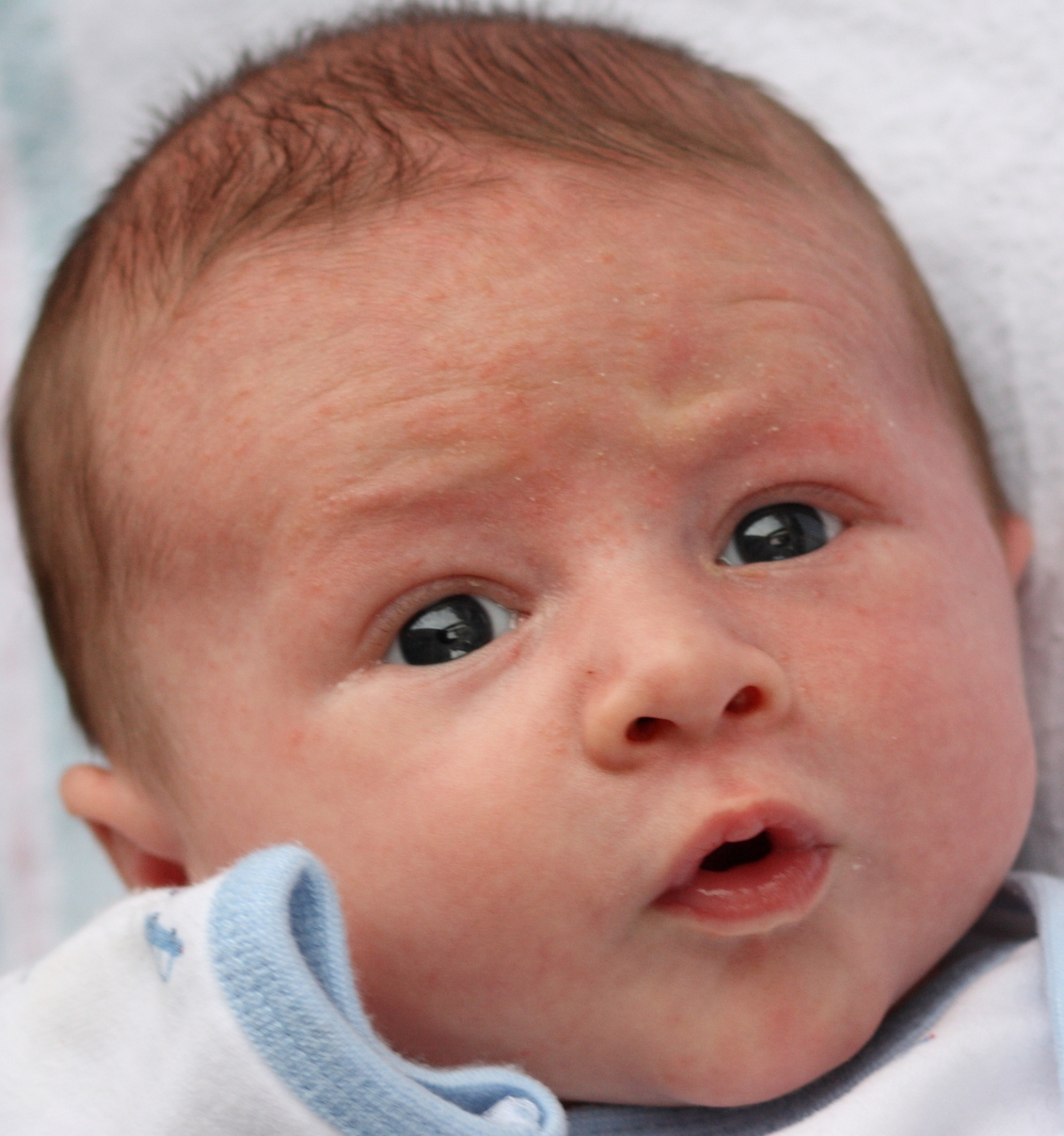
- An infant with neonatal acne on the face, especially the forehead
- Specialty: Dermatology

Neonatal acne, also known as acne neonatorum, is a type of acne that develops in newborns, typically within the first six weeks of life. It presents with open and closed comedones on the cheeks, chin and forehead.

The main cause is not known for certain but it may be caused by maternal androgens transferred from the mother to the newborn from the placenta and androgens produced by the fetal adrenal gland and neonatal testicles that stimulate sebaceous glands to increase production of sebum. As a self-limiting condition, neonatal acne tends to resolve on its own but treatment options can include topical benzoyl peroxide, topical retinoids, topical antibiotics and topical antifungals.

== Signs and symptoms ==
Neonatal acne presents from birth to within the first 4–6 weeks of life. Common symptoms are open and closed comedones such as papules and pustules that occur most commonly on the face on the areas of the cheeks, chin and forehead. Less commonly, lesions can be present on the chest and back.

== Causes ==
It is believed that maternal androgens passed to the infant through the placenta has a role in stimulating sebaceous glands leading to increased sebum production that causes comedone formation. Dehydroepiandrosterone (DHEA) produced from the fetal adrenal gland and androgen production from neonatal testicles may also stimulate sebum production from sebaceous glands.

The role of genetics is unclear but a positive family history supports association with neonatal acne.

Some researchers suggest the role of Malassezia colonization causing hypersensitivity reactions in skin but this tends to be linked to neonatal cephalic pustulosis more so than neonatal acne.

== Diagnosis ==
A work up is suggested in cases of severe acneiform eruptions or with signs of growth abnormalities to rule out potential endocrine diseases, tumor formation, or gonadal development abnormalities. A referral to a pediatric endocrinologist may be warranted.

=== Differential Diagnosis ===
Other causes of acneiform eruptions such as those induced by the use of topical products like creams, ointments and shampoos on the skin are often ruled out before diagnosis. Maternal medications like lithium and high dose corticosteroids may also induce formulation of pustules in newborns and can be assessed with a thorough family history. Likewise, newborns can be assessed for infection whether bacterial, fungal or viral in nature. Erythema toxicum neonatorum, neonatal cephalic pustulosis, transient neonatal pustular melanosis, folliculitis, miliaria and milia are often ruled out before diagnosis.

Some experts consider neonatal cephalic pustulosis (NCP) a form of neonatal acne while others do not. NCP presents with facial papules and pustules but no comedones. NCP has been linked to Malassezia colonization, a normal yeast found on skin, but inconsistent patterns of positive colonization and NCP suggests that Malassezia hypersensitivity reactions in susceptible newborns are the cause of the acneiform eruptions rather than colonization itself.

== Treatment ==
Neonatal acne will typically resolve by itself in 2–6 months. In mild cases, cleansing the face daily with gentle soap and water while avoiding use of potential comedogenic soaps, lotions and oils is often enough. Further treatment is not necessary but in severe or persistent cases topical therapy can be initiated.

=== Benzoyl Peroxide ===
Topical benzoyl peroxide (BPO) may be indicated in persistent or inflammatory cases. BPO is a lipophilic agent that penetrates into sebaceous glands and generates reactive oxygen species that kill P. acnes. It also has comedolytic and anti-inflammatory properties and can prevent development of antimicrobial resistance.

=== Topical Retinoids ===
Topical retinoids can be used alone or in combination with BPO. Retinoids are derived from vitamin A. They bind to retinoic receptors to normalize the rate of keratinocyte growth and prevent inflammation. Overactive keratinocyte production can lead to comedone formation.

=== Topical Antibiotics ===
In cases where scarring is a concern, topical antibiotics may be recommended. Topical clindamycin and erythromycin are the most commonly prescribed options for acne. Antibiotics kill P. acnes on skin that could be causing inflammation. With the emergence of resistant P. acnes, experts recommend topical antibiotics to be used in combination with BPO to reduce the risk of development of antimicrobial resistance. The most common side effects of topical antibiotics are stinging, burning and redness at the site of application.

=== Topical antifungals ===
Some experts suggest the use of topical ketoconazole in newborns with more pustular neonatal acne as there is evidence it shortens duration of lesions. This may be in cases more suggestive of neonatal cephalic pustulosis than neonatal acne.

== Epidemiology ==
20% of newborns will develop neonatal acne. However, there has been debate if this is an accurate representation of actual diagnosed cases of acne as this could include other acneiform eruptions that do not present with comedones like neonatal cephalic pustulosis. Neonatal acne occurs more often in boys than in girls.

== See also ==
- Acne aestivalis
- Infantile acne
- List of cutaneous conditions
