= Neonatal herpes =

Neonatal herpes simplex
- Other names: Neonatal herpes
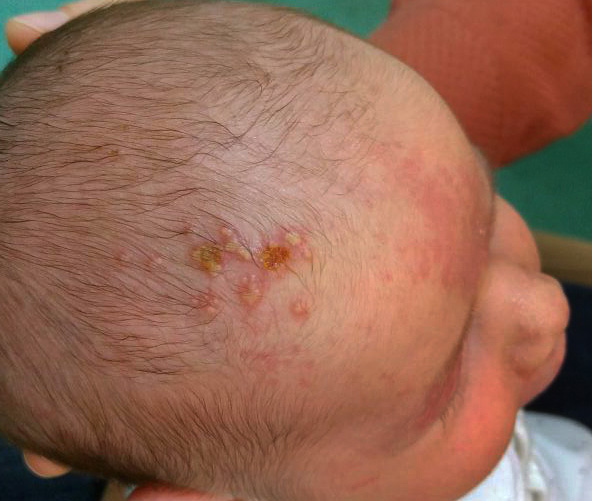
- A cutaneo-mucous form of herpes simplex in a neonate
- Specialty: Pediatrics
- Usual onset: Congenital
- Causes: Herpes simplex virus infection
- Frequency: 1 in 10,000 births

Neonatal herpes simplex, or simply neonatal herpes, is a herpes infection in a newborn baby, caused by the herpes simplex virus (HSV). It occurs mostly as a result of vertical transmission of the HSV from an affected mother to her baby. Types include skin, eye, and mouth herpes (SEM), disseminated herpes (DIS), and central nervous system herpes (CNS). Depending on the type, symptoms vary from a fever to small blisters, irritability, low body temperature, lethargy, breathing difficulty, and a large abdomen due to ascites or large liver. There may be red streaming eyes or no symptoms.

The cause is HSV 1 and 2. It can infect the unborn baby, but more often passes to the baby during childbirth. Onset is typically in the first six weeks after birth. The baby is at greater risk of being affected if the mother contracts HSV in later pregnancy. In such scenarios a prolonged rupture of membranes or childbirth trauma may increase the risk further.

Globally, it is estimated to affect one in 10,000 births. Around 1 in every 3,500 babies in the United States contract the infection.

== Signs and symptoms ==
Neonatal herpes manifests itself in three forms: skin, eye, and mouth herpes (SEM, sometimes referred to as "localized"); disseminated herpes (DIS); and central nervous system herpes (CNS).

- SEM herpes is characterized by external lesions but no internal organ involvement. Lesions are likely to appear on trauma sites such as the attachment site of fetal scalp electrodes, forceps, or vacuum extractors that are used during delivery; in the margin of the eyes; in the nasopharynx; and in areas associated with trauma or surgery (including circumcision).
- DIS herpes affects internal organs, particularly the liver.
- CNS herpes is an infection of the nervous system and the brain that can lead to encephalitis. Infants with CNS herpes present with seizures, tremors, lethargy, and irritability. They feed poorly, have unstable temperatures, and their fontanelle (soft spot of the skull) may bulge.

CNS herpes is associated with higher morbidity, while DIS herpes has a higher mortality rate. These categories are not mutually exclusive and there is often overlap of two or more types. SEM herpes has the best prognosis of the three, however if left untreated it may progress to disseminated or CNS herpes with attendant increases in mortality and morbidity.

Death from neonatal HSV disease in the U.S. is currently decreasing; the current death rate is about 25%, down from as high as 85% in untreated cases just a few decades ago. Other complications from neonatal herpes include prematurity, with approximately 50% of cases having a gestation of 38 weeks or less, and concurrent sepsis in approximately one-quarter of cases that further clouds speedy diagnosis.

== Cause ==
The cause is HSV 1 and 2. It can infect the unborn baby, but more often passes to the baby during childbirth. Onset is typically in the first six weeks after birth. The baby is at greater risk of being affected if the mother contracts HSV in later pregnancy. In such scenarios a prolonged rupture of membranes may increase the risk further. Sites of injury such as forceps or scalp electrodes may provide a portal of entry for HSV.

=== Risk factors ===
Maternal risk factors for neonatal HSV-1 include: White non-Hispanic race, young maternal age (<25), primary infection in third trimester, first pregnancy, HSV (1&2) seronegativity, a discordant partner, gestation <38 weeks, and receptive oral sex in the third trimester.

Neonatal HSV-2 maternal risk factors: Black race, young maternal age (<21), a discordant partner, primary or non-primary first episode infection in the third trimester, four or more lifetime sexual partners, lower level of education, history of previous STD, history of pregnancy wastage, first viable pregnancy, and gestation <38 weeks.

=== Transmission ===
The majority of cases (85%) occur during birth when the baby comes in contact with infected genital secretions in the birth canal, most common with mothers that have newly been exposed to the virus (mothers that had the virus before pregnancy have a lower risk of transmission). An estimated 5% are infected in utero, and approximately 10% of cases are acquired postnatally. Detection and prevention is difficult because transmission is asymptomatic in 60–98% of cases.

Post-natal transmission incidences can happen from a source other than the mother, such as an Orthodox Jewish mohel with herpetic gingivostomatitis who performs oral suction on a circumcision wound without using a prophylactic barrier to prevent contact between the baby's penis and the mohel's mouth.

== Diagnosis ==
Diagnosis is by blood tests and culture. Swabs are generally taken from the mouth, nose, throat, eyes, and anus, for HSV culture an PCR. Fluid from any blisters can be swabbed too. Liver enzymes may be the first sign to be noted when suspecting neonatal HSV. Other tests include a lumbar puncture and medical imaging of the brain; MRI, CT scan, ultrasound. An assessment of the eyes may reveal eye disease.

=== Differential diagnosis ===
Other skin conditions that may appear similar include erythema toxicum neonatorum, transient neonatal pustular melanosis, infantile acne, miliaria, infantile acropustulosis, and sucking blisters. CNS disease may appear like bacterial or other viral meningitis's. Conjunctivitis due to bacterial infection or other viruses can look like neonatal herpes eye disease. Bacterial sepsis, viral hepatitis, and other infections including cytomegalovirus, toxoplasmosis, syphilis, rubella may mimic the disseminated type.

== Treatment ==
Reductions in morbidity and mortality are due to the use of antiviral treatments such as vidarabine and acyclovir. However, morbidity and mortality still remain high due to diagnosis of DIS and CNS herpes coming too late for effective antiviral administration; early diagnosis is difficult in the 20–40% of infected neonates that have no visible lesions. A recent large-scale retrospective study found disseminated NHSV patients least likely to get timely treatment, contributing to the high morbidity/mortality in that group.

Harrison's Principles of Internal Medicine recommends that pregnant women with active genital herpes lesions at the time of labor be delivered by caesarean section. Women whose herpes is not active can be managed with acyclovir. The current practice is to deliver women with primary or first episode non-primary infection via caesarean section, and those with recurrent infection vaginally (even in the presence of lesions) because of the low risk (1–3%) of vertical transmission associated with recurrent herpes.

== Epidemiology ==
Neonatal HSV rates in the U.S. are estimated to be between 1 in 3,000 and 1 in 20,000 live births. Approximately 22% of pregnant women in the U.S. have had previous exposure to HSV-2, and an additional 2% acquire the virus during pregnancy, mirroring the HSV-2 infection rate in the general population. The risk of transmission to the newborn is 30–57% in cases where the mother acquired a primary infection in the third trimester of pregnancy. Risk of transmission by a mother with existing antibodies for both HSV-1 and HSV-2 has a much lower (1–3%) transmission rate. This in part is due to the transfer of a significant titer of protective maternal antibodies to the fetus from about the seventh month of pregnancy. However, shedding of HSV-1 from both primary genital infection and reactivations is associated with higher transmission from mother to infant.

HSV-1 neonatal herpes is extremely rare in developing countries because development of HSV-1 specific antibodies usually occurs in childhood or adolescence, precluding a later genital HSV-1 infection. HSV-2 infections are much more common in these countries. In industrialized nations, the adolescent HSV-1 seroprevalence has been dropping steadily for the last 5 decades. The resulting increase in the number of young women becoming sexually active while HSV-1 seronegative has contributed to increased HSV-1 genital herpes rates, and as a result, increased HSV-1 neonatal herpes in developed nations. A study in the United States from 2003 to 2014 using large administrative databases showed increasing trends in incidence of neonatal HSV from 7.9 to 10 cases per 100,000 live births and mortality of 6.5%. Babies of decreased gestational age and those of African American race had higher incidences of neonatal HSV. Another study from Canada showed similar results, with an incidence of 5.9 per 100,000 live births and a case fatality of 15.5%. A three-year study in Canada (2000–2003) revealed a neonatal HSV incidence of 5.9 per 100,000 live births and a case fatality rate of 15.5%. HSV-1 was the cause of 62.5% of cases of neonatal herpes of known type, and 98.3% of transmission was asymptomatic. Asymptomatic genital HSV-1 has been shown to be more infectious to the neonate, and is more likely to produce neonatal herpes than HSV-2. However, with prompt application of antiviral therapy, the prognosis of neonatal HSV-1 infection is better than that for HSV-2.
