= Heterokaryon =

Heterokaryon in fungal mitosis

In biology, a heterokaryon is a multinucleate cell that contains genetically different nuclei. This is a special type of syncytium. This can occur naturally, such as in the mycelium of fungi during sexual reproduction, or artificially as formed by the experimental fusion of two genetically different cells, as e.g., in hybridoma technology.

== Etymology ==
The term heterokaryosis for the property of having genetically unlike nuclei is borrowed from the German Heterokaryosis, which was coined by the German botanist Hans Burgeff in a 1912 paper about his work on the fungus Phycomyces nitens. It is based on Greek hetero, meaning "different," and karyon, meaning "kernel" or in this case "nucleus.".

== Occurrence ==
Heterokaryons are found in the life cycle of yeasts, for example Saccharomyces cerevisiae, a genetic model organism. The heterokaryon stage is produced from the fusion of two haploid cells. This transient heterokaryon can produce further haploid buds, or cell nuclei can fuse and produce a diploid cell, which can then undergo mitosis.

=== Ciliate protozoans ===
The term was first used for ciliate protozoans such as Tetrahymena. This has two types of cell nuclei, a large, somatic macronucleus and a small, germline micronucleus. Both exist in a single cell at the same time and carry out different functions with distinct cytological and biochemical properties.

=== True fungi ===
Many fungi (notably the arbuscular mycorrhizal fungi) exhibit heterokaryosis. The haploid nuclei within a mycelium may differ from one another not merely by accumulating mutations, but by the non-sexual fusion of genetically distinct fungal hyphae, although a self / non-self recognition system exists in Fungi and usually prevents fusions with non-self.

Heterokaryosis is also common upon mating, as in Dikarya (Ascomycota and Basidiomycota). Mating requires the encounter of two haploid nuclei of compatible mating types. These nuclei do not immediately fuse, and remain haploid in a n+n state until the very onset of meiosis: this phenomenon is called delayed karyogamy. Heterokaryosis can lead to individuals that have different nuclei in different parts of their mycelium, although in ascomycetes, particularly in "Neurospora", nuclei have been shown to flow and mix throughout the mycelium. In heterokaryons, the notion of individual itself becomes vague since the rule of “one genome = one individual” does not apply any more. Genetic heterogeneity within an individual is indeed usually considered to be detrimental, as selfish variants may be selected for and disrupt the integrity of the individual level.

=== Slime molds ===
Heterokaryosis is most common in fungi, but also occurs in slime molds. This happens because the nuclei in the 'plasmodium' form are the products of many pairwise fusions between amoeboid haploid individuals. When genetically divergent nuclei come together in the plasmodium form, cheaters have been shown to emerge. However, genetic homogeneity among fusing amoeboid serves to maintain the multicellular plasmodium.

== Artificial heterokaryon ==
A medical example is a heterokaryon composed of nuclei from Hurler syndrome and Hunter syndrome. Both of these diseases result in problems in mucopolysaccharide metabolism. However, a heterokaryon of nuclei from both of these diseases exhibits normal mucopolysaccharide metabolism, proving that the two syndromes affect different proteins and so can correct each other in the heterokaryon.

== See also ==
- Dikaryon
- Heterokairy
