= Acropustulosis =

- Specialty: Dermatology

Acropustulosis refers to acrodermatitis with pustular involvement.

Types include:

- Pustulosis palmaris et plantaris
- Infantile acropustulosis
