= Syncytium =

Type of multinucleate cell

A syncytium (/sɪnˈsɪʃiəm/; pl.: syncytia; from Greek: σύν syn "together" and κύτος kytos "box, i.e. cell") (also syncyitium) or symplasm is a multinucleate cell that can result from multiple cell fusions of uninuclear cells (i.e., cells with a single nucleus), in contrast to a coenocyte, which can result from multiple nuclear divisions without accompanying cytokinesis. The muscle cell that makes up animal skeletal muscle is a classic example of a syncytium cell. The term may also refer to cells interconnected by specialized membranes with gap junctions, as seen in the heart muscle cells and certain smooth muscle cells, which are synchronized electrically in an action potential.

The field of embryogenesis uses the word syncytium to refer to the coenocytic blastoderm embryos of invertebrates, such as Drosophila melanogaster.

== Physiological examples ==
=== Protists ===
In protists, syncytia can be found in some rhizarians (e.g., chlorarachniophytes, plasmodiophorids, haplosporidians) and acellular slime moulds, dictyostelids (amoebozoans), acrasids (Excavata) and Haplozoon.

=== Plants ===
Some examples of plant syncytia, which result during plant development, include:

- Developing endosperm
- The non-articulated laticifers
- The plasmodial tapetum, and
- The "nucellar plasmodium" of the family Podostemaceae

=== Fungi ===
A syncytium is the normal cell structure for many fungi.

Most fungi of Basidiomycota exist as a dikaryon in which thread-like cells of the mycelium are partially partitioned into segments each containing two differing nuclei, called a heterokaryon.

=== Animals ===
==== Nerve net ====
The neurons which makes up the subepithelial nerve net in comb jellies (Ctenophora) are fused into a neural syncytium, consisting of a continuous plasma membrane instead of being connected through synapses.

==== Skeletal muscle ====
A classic example of a syncytium is the formation of skeletal muscle. Large skeletal muscle fibers form by the fusion of thousands of individual muscle cells. The multinucleated arrangement is important in pathologic states such as myopathy, where focal necrosis (death) of a portion of a skeletal muscle fiber does not result in necrosis of the adjacent sections of that same skeletal muscle fiber, because those adjacent sections have their own nuclear material. Thus, myopathy is usually associated with such "segmental necrosis", with some of the surviving segments being functionally cut off from their nerve supply via loss of continuity with the neuromuscular junction.

==== Cardiac muscle ====
The syncytium of cardiac muscle is important because it allows rapid coordinated contraction of muscles along their entire length. Cardiac action potentials propagate along the surface of the muscle fiber from the point of synaptic contact through intercalated discs. Although a syncytium, cardiac muscle differs because the cells are not long and multinucleated. Cardiac tissue is therefore described as a functional syncytium, as opposed to the true syncytium of skeletal muscle.

==== Smooth muscle ====
Smooth muscle in the gastrointestinal tract is activated by a composite of three types of cells – smooth muscle cells (SMCs), interstitial cells of Cajal (ICCs), and platelet-derived growth factor receptor alpha (PDGFRα) that are electrically coupled and work together as an SIP functional syncytium.

==== Osteoclasts ====
Certain animal immune-derived cells may form aggregate cells, such as the osteoclast cells responsible for bone resorption.

==== Placenta ====
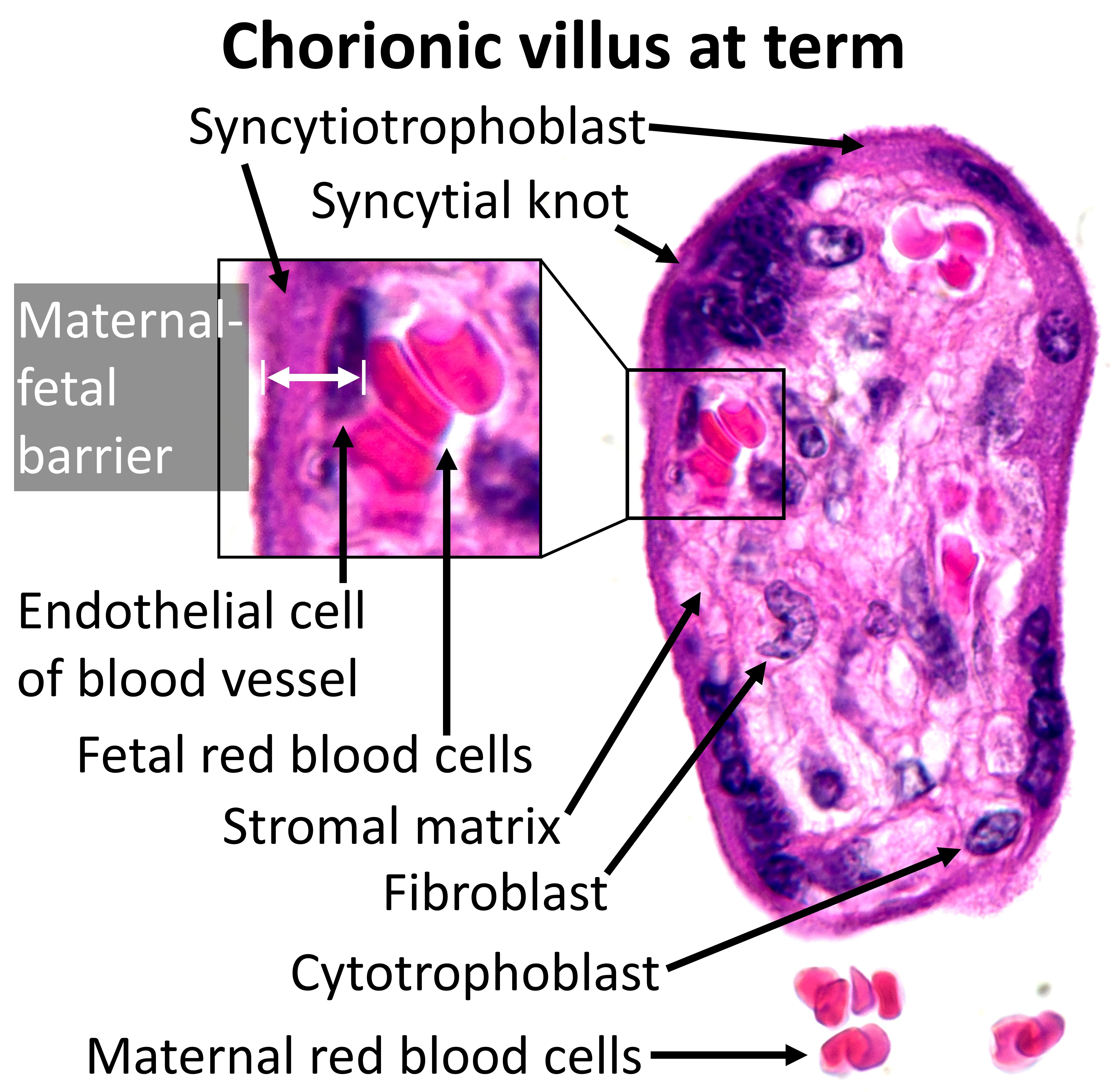
High-magnification H&E micrograph of a cross-section of a chorionic villus of the placenta, showing its coverage by a continuous multinucleated syncytiotrophoblast, including a focal aggregation of syncytial nuclei termed a syncytial knot.

Another important vertebrate syncytium is in the placenta of placental mammals. Embryo-derived cells that form the interface with the maternal blood stream fuse together to form a multinucleated maternal-fetal barrier – the syncytiotrophoblast. This is part of creating immune tolerance in pregnancy, that is, to prevent an immune response that would normally result in the rejection of something foreign in the body. The syncytiotrophoblast is made of fetal cells, but prevents expression of antigens on the surface that the mother's immune system would react to, such as HLA. The syncytium serves as an even more selective barrier than would have been possible between cells, such as cells with tight junctions, as for example some blood cells are specialized to be able to insert themselves between adjacent epithelial cells.

==== Glass sponges ====
Much of the body of Hexactinellid sponges is composed of syncitial tissue. This allows them to form their large siliceous spicules exclusively inside their cells.

==== Tegument ====
The fine structure of the tegument in helminths is essentially the same in both the cestodes and trematodes. A typical tegument is 7–16 μm thick, with distinct layers. It is a syncytium consisting of multinucleated tissues with no distinct cell boundaries. The outer zone of the syncytium, called the "distal cytoplasm," is lined with a plasma membrane. This plasma membrane is in turn associated with a layer of carbohydrate-containing macromolecules known as the glycocalyx, that varies in thickness from one species to another. The distal cytoplasm is connected to the inner layer called the "proximal cytoplasm", which is the "cellular region or cyton or perikarya" through cytoplasmic tubes that are composed of microtubules. The proximal cytoplasm contains nuclei, endoplasmic reticulum, Golgi complex, mitochondria, ribosomes, glycogen deposits, and numerous vesicles. The innermost layer is bounded by a layer of connective tissue known as the "basal lamina". The basal lamina is followed by a thick layer of muscle.

== Pathological examples ==
=== Viral infection ===
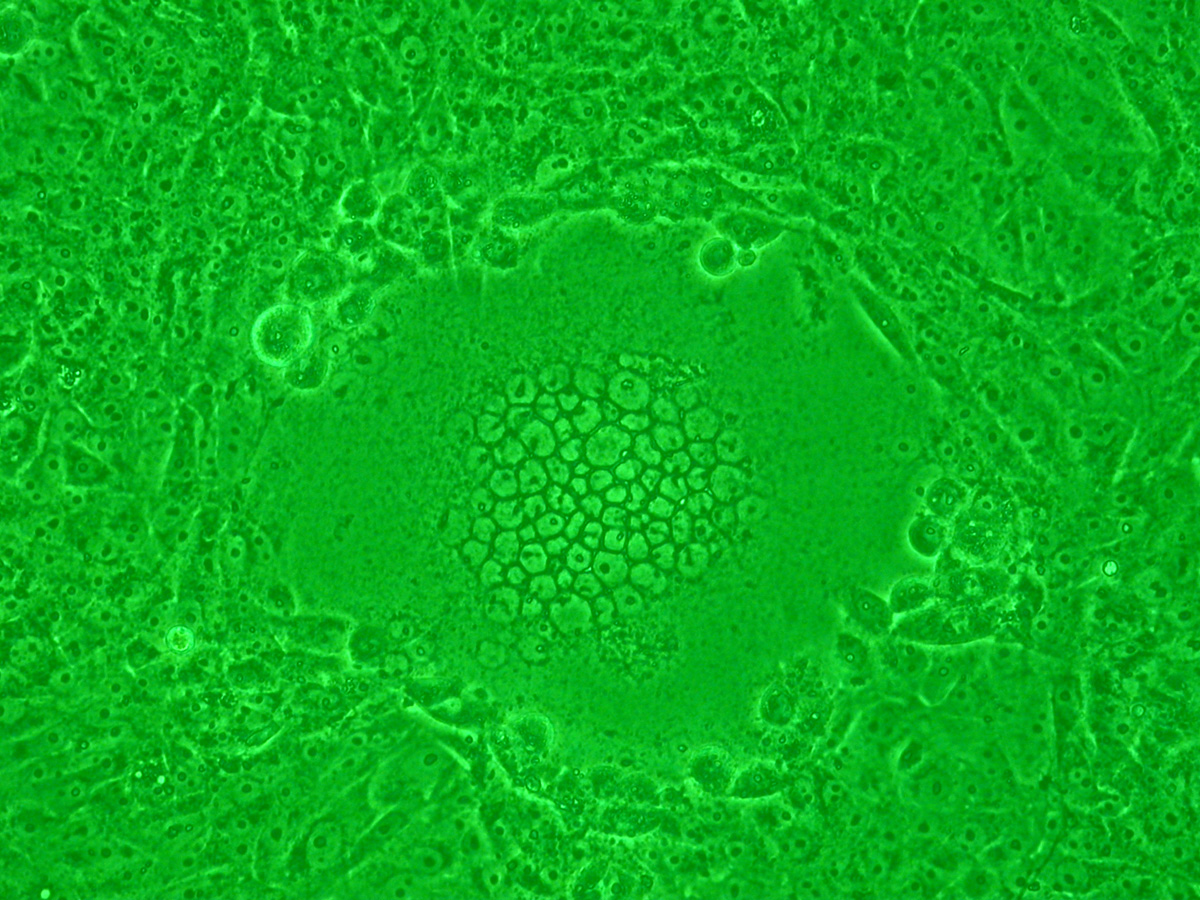
Syncytium caused by HSV-1 infection in Vero cells

Syncytia can also form when cells are infected with certain types of viruses, notably HSV-1, HIV, MeV, SARS-CoV-2, and pneumoviruses, e.g. respiratory syncytial virus (RSV). These syncytial formations create distinctive cytopathic effects when seen in permissive cells. Because many cells fuse together, syncytia are also known as multinucleated cells, giant cells, or polykaryocytes. During infection, viral fusion proteins used by the virus to enter the cell are transported to the cell surface, where they can cause the host cell membrane to fuse with neighboring cells.

==== Reoviridae ====
Typically, the viral families that can cause syncytia are enveloped, because viral envelope proteins on the surface of the host cell are needed to fuse with other cells. Certain members of the Reoviridae family are notable exceptions due to a unique set of proteins known as fusion-associated small transmembrane (FAST) proteins. Reovirus induced syncytium formation is not found in humans, but is found in a number of other species and is caused by fusogenic orthoreoviruses. These fusogenic orthoreoviruses include reptilian orthoreovirus, avian orthoreovirus, Nelson Bay orthoreovirus, and baboon orthoreovirus.

==== HIV ====
HIV infects Helper CD4^{+} T cells and makes them produce viral proteins, including fusion proteins. Then, the cells begin to display surface HIV glycoproteins, which are antigenic. Normally, a cytotoxic T cell will immediately come to "inject" lymphotoxins, such as perforin or granzyme, that will kill the infected T helper cell. However, if T helper cells are nearby, the gp41 HIV receptors displayed on the surface of the T helper cell will bind to other similar lymphocytes. This makes dozens of T helper cells fuse cell membranes into a giant, nonfunctional syncytium, which allows the HIV virion to kill many T helper cells by infecting only one. It is associated with a faster progression of the disease

==== Mumps ====
The mumps virus uses HN protein to stick to a potential host cell, then, the fusion protein allows it to bind with the host cell. The HN and fusion proteins are then left on the host cell walls, causing it to bind with neighbour epithelial cells.

==== COVID-19 ====
Mutations within SARS-CoV-2 variants contain spike protein variants that can enhance syncytia formation. The protease TMPRSS2 is essential for syncytia formation. Syncytia can allow the virus to spread directly to other cells, shielded from neutralizing antibodies and other immune system components. Syncytia formation in cells can be pathological to tissues.

"Severe cases of COVID-19 are associated with extensive lung damage and the presence of infected multinucleated syncytial pneumocytes. The viral and cellular mechanisms regulating the formation of these syncytia are not well understood," but membrane cholesterol seems necessary.

The syncytia appear to be long-lasting; the "complete regeneration" of the lungs after severe flu "does not happen" with COVID-19.

== See also ==
- Atrial syncytium
- Coenocyte
- Giant cell
- Heterokaryon
- Heterokaryosis
- Plasmodium (life cycle)
  - Enteridium lycoperdon, a plasmodial slime mold
- Syncytiotrophoblast
- Xenophyophorea
