= Immunoperoxidase =

Type of immunostain

Immunoperoxidase is a type of immunostain used in molecular biology, medical research, and clinical diagnostics. In particular, immunoperoxidase reactions refer to a sub-class of immunohistochemical or immunocytochemical procedures in which the antibodies are visualized via a peroxidase-catalyzed reaction.

Immunohistochemistry and immunocytochemistry are methods used to determine in which cells or parts of cells, a particular protein or other macromolecule are located. These stains use antibodies to bind to specific antigens, usually of protein or glycoprotein origin. Since antibodies are normally invisible, special strategies must be employed to detect these bound antibodies. In an immunoperoxidase procedure, an enzyme known as a peroxidase is used to catalyze a chemical reaction to produce a coloured product.

Simply, a very thin slice of tissue is fixed onto glass, incubated with antibody or a series of antibodies, the last of which is chemically linked to peroxidase. After developing the stain by adding the chemical substrate, the distribution of the stain can be examined by microscopy.

== Types of antibodies ==
Originally all antibodies produced for immunostaining were polyclonal, i.e. raised by normal antibody reactions in animals such as horses or rabbits. Now, many are monoclonal, i.e. produced in tissue culture. Monoclonal antibodies that consist of only one type of antibody tend to provide greater antigen specificity, and also tend to be more consistent between batches.

== Methods for immunoperoxidase staining ==
The first step in immunoperoxidase staining is the binding of the specific (primary) antibody to the cell or tissue sample. The detection of the primary antibody can be then accomplished directly (example 1) or indirectly (examples 2 & 3).

Example 1. The primary antibody can be directly tagged with the enzyme peroxidase which is then used to catalyse a chemical reaction to generate a coloured product.

Example 2. The primary antibody can be tagged with a small molecule that can be recognised by a peroxidase-conjugated binding molecule with high affinity. The most common example of this is a biotin linked primary antibody that binds to an enzyme-bound streptavidin. This method can be used to amplify the signal.

Example 3. An untagged primary antibody is detected using a general secondary antibody that recognises all antibodies originating from same animal species as the primary. The secondary antibody is tagged with peroxidase.

Optimal staining depends on a number of factors including the antibody dilution, the staining chemicals, the preparation and/or fixation of the cells/tissue, and length of incubation with antibody/staining reagents. These are often determined by trial and error rather than any sort of systematic approach.

== Alternatives to peroxidase stains ==
Other catalytic enzymes such as alkaline phosphatase can be used instead of peroxidases for both direct and indirect staining methods. Alternatively, the primary antibody can be detected using fluorescent label (immunofluorescence), or be attached to colloidal gold particles for electron microscopy.

== Uses of immunoperoxidase staining ==
Immunoperoxidase staining is used in clinical diagnostics and in laboratory research.

In clinical diagnostics, immunostaining can be used on tissue biopsies for more detailed histopathological study. In the case of cancer, it can aid in sub-classifying tumours. Immunostaining can also be used to help diagnose skin conditions, glomerulonephritis and to sub classify amyloid deposits. Related techniques are also useful in sub-typing lymphocytes which all look quite similar on light microscopy.

In laboratory research, antibodies against specific markers of cellular differentiation can be used to label individual cell types. This can enable a better understanding of mechanistic changes to specific cell lineages resulting from a particular experimental intervention.

== See also ==
- Indirect immunoperoxidase assay
