= Monokaryon =

Fungal mycelium or hypha

A monokaryon is a fungal mycelium or hypha in which each cell contains a single nucleus. It also refers to a mononuclear spore or cell of a fungus that produces a dikaryon in its life cycle.

Monokaryons are a fundamental stage in the life cycle of species in the mycological division of Basidiomycota. Haploid Basidiomycota mycelia are considered monokaryons, as they typically fuse through plasmogamy, after which the compatible nuclei migrate into the other mycelia. In the Ascomycota division, which forms the subkingdom of Dikarya with Basidiomycota, monokaryons are a part of the species life cycle, but are usually not present as stable hyphal forms, such as those seen in Basidiomycota.

== See also ==
- Dikaryon
