= Indirect immunoperoxidase assay =

Laboratory technique to detect viruses

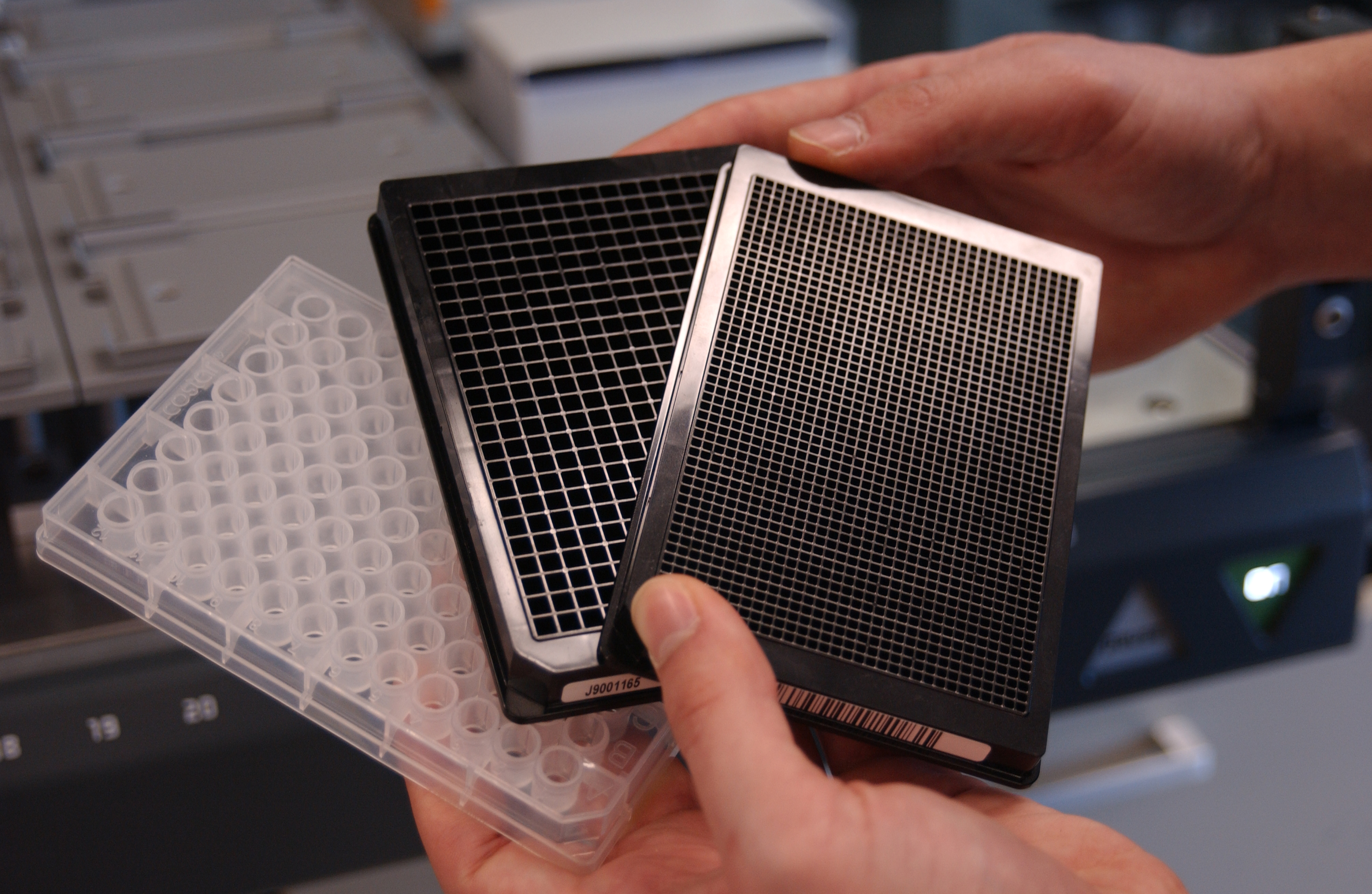
Microtiter plates with 96, 384 and 1536 wells

Indirect immunoperoxidase assay (IPA) is a laboratory technique used to detect and titrate viruses that do not cause measurable cytopathic effects and cannot be measured by classical plaque assays. These viruses include human coronavirus 229E and OC43.

== Methodology ==
Susceptible cells are inoculated with serial logarithmic dilutions of samples in a 96-well plate. After viral growth, viral detection by IPA yields the infectious virus titer, expressed as tissue culture infectious dose (TCID50). This represents the dilution of a virus-containing sample at which half of a series of laboratory wells contain replicating viruses. This technique is a reliable method for the titration of human coronaviruses (HCoV) in biological samples (cells, tissues, or fluids). It is also reliable in the detection of antibodies to human cytomegalovirus.

== See also ==
- Coronavirus
- Immunoassay
- Immunoperoxidase
- Virus quantification
