= Transient neonatal pustular melanosis =

- Other names: Transient neonatal pustulosis and lentigines neonatorum
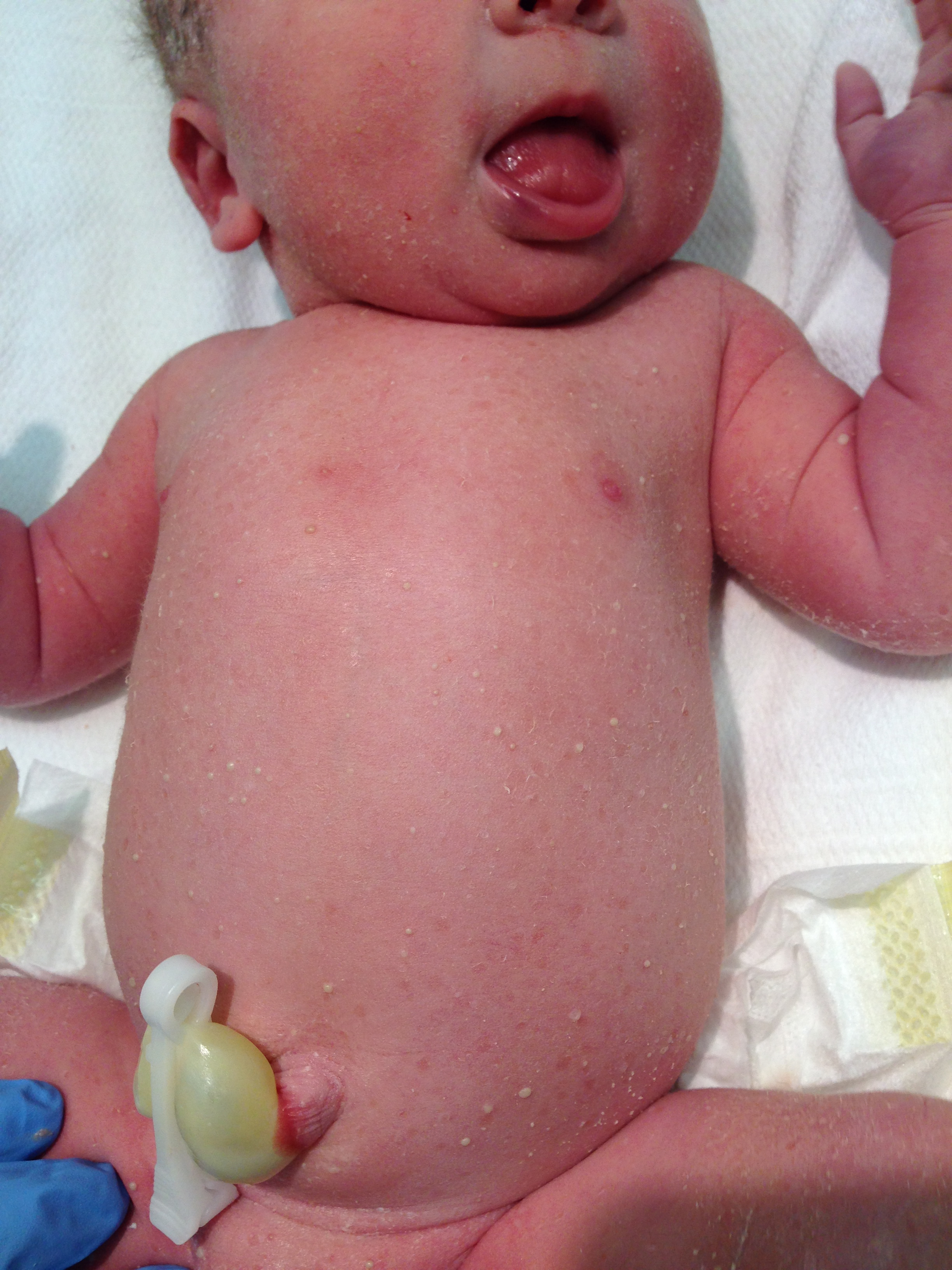
- Transient neonatal pustular melanosis
- Specialty: Dermatology, pediatrics

Transient neonatal pustular melanosis (TNPM), also known as pustular melanosis, is a type of neonatal pustular eruption that is a transient rash common in newborns. It is vesiculopustular rash made up of 1–3 mm fluid-filled lesions that rupture, leaving behind a collarette of scale and a brown macule. The lesions are fragile and with no surrounding erythema. This rash occurs only in the newborn stage, usually appearing a few days after birth, but pigmented macules are sometimes already present at birth. The rash usually fades over three to four weeks but may linger for up to three months after birth. It can occur anywhere on the body, including the palms and soles.

The cause of TNPM is unknown. It has been suggested that TNPM is merely a variant of erythema toxicum neonatorum or a "precocious" form of erythema toxicum neonatorum. No treatment is needed except for parental reassurance.

== History ==
Transient neonatal pustular melanosis was initially described in 1961 as lentigines neonatorum and as such was not fully distinguished from other similar rashes.

Transient neonatal pustular melanosis was clearly identified in 1976 by Ramamurthy et al.

== Causes ==
The cause of TNPM is unknown.

It has been suggested that TNPM is merely a precocious form of erythema toxicum neonatorum based on the similar histopathology.

== Diagnosis ==
Transient neonatal pustular melanosis is diagnosed clinically, based on appearance alone, with no need for special testing. Proper identification is important to distinguish it from other serious, infectious neonatal diseases and to help avoid unnecessary diagnostic testing and treatments.

A smear of the pustular contents will show polymorphic neutrophils and occasional eosinophils on Wright's stain.

On histopathology, the pigmented macules will show basal and supra-basal increase in pigmentation without any pigmentary incontinence. Bacterial culture will be negative.

Increased frequency of placental squamous metaplasia has been reported in the mothers of some of these infants.

== Treatment ==
No treatment is needed except for parental reassurance. The rash spontaneously resolves, usually in three to four weeks, but the pigmented macules may linger for up to three months after birth.

== Epidemiology ==
The incidence of TNPM is 0.6% in white infants and 4.4% in African-American infants in the United States. This rash also generally has a higher incidence in non-African-American infants with skin of color.

There is significant regional variation and the incidence can vary widely in other nations. For example, in Brazil, transient neonatal pustular melanosis occurs in 9.6% of all newborns.

TNPM occurs equally in both sexes.

Genetic influence is unlikely as it has been reported in only one of pairs of identical twins.

== See also ==
- List of cutaneous conditions
