= Infantile acne =

- Other names: Neonatal cephalic pustulosis
- Specialty: Dermatology

Infantile acne is a form of acne that begins in very young children. Typical symptoms include inflammatory and noninflammatory lesions, papules and pustules most commonly present on the face. No cause of infantile acne has been established but it may be caused by increased sebaceous gland secretions due to elevated androgens, genetics and the fetal adrenal gland causing increased sebum production. Infantile acne can resolve by itself by age 1 or 2. However, treatment options include topical benzyl peroxide, topical retinoids and topical antibiotics in most cases.

== Signs and symptoms ==
Infantile acne has a later onset and is less commonly seen than neonatal acne, occurring between 6 weeks to 1 year of age. It is also more commonly seen in boys rather than girls. Infantile acne tends to be more inflammatory and wide spread than neonatal acne. It presents with both open and closed comedones, papules and pustules. Cystic lesions are uncommon. Scarring can occur in severe cases. Very rarely, facial conglobate acne, a severe form of acne that involves extensive inflammation and nodule formation can develop and lead to extensive scarring. Lesions occur most commonly on the cheeks but can also appear on the chest and back. More severe occurrences may lead to development of more severe forms of acne in adolescence.

== Causes ==
The cause of infantile acne is not known for certain. Research into higher occurrence in boys rather than girls imply that higher than normal levels of testicular androgens can cause increased sebaceous gland secretions. During the first 6–12 months of age, there is increased sebum production stimulated by luteinizing hormone (LH) and testosterone of testicular origin that stops after this period until adrenarche. Girls do not experience this.

Genetics and family history play a role in influencing sebaceous gland size and activity, pore size and inflammation that can increase risk of onset and presentation of infantile acne.

It is suggested that the fetal adrenal gland along with testicular androgen could be the cause of infantile acne. During the neonatal period, there is increased sebum production through an enlarged zona reticularis (an androgen producing area) on the fetal adrenal gland that gradually decreases to very low levels at around 1 years of age, coinciding with when infantile acne tends to resolve. The fetal adrenal gland produces androgens such as dehydroepiandrosterone (DHEA) and dehydroepiandrosterone sulfate (DHEAS) that stimulate sebaceous glands.

== Diagnosis ==
Diagnosis is based on presentation of comedones primarily on the face of an infant of 6–12 months of age. Severity can be mild, moderate or severe and can be determined from the presence and distribution of comedones and inflammatory lesions such as papules and nodules. A physical may be followed up next with particular attention paid to signs of an endocrine disorder including normal growth and weight, testicular growth, breast development, hirsutism or growth of pubic hair. Hormonal workup may not be necessary unless one of these abnormalities is present, then work up of testosterone, DHEA, DHEAS, LH and FSH or referral to a pediatric endocrinologist specialist may be recommended.

=== Differential diagnosis ===
It is important to differentiate infantile acne from other forms of acneiform eruptions. Acne venenata infantum is a form of acne characterized by comedone formation and induced by chemical irritants on the skin. This can include comedogenic products such as lotions, ointments, creams and oils. Upon discontinuation of these products, lesions will heal within 6–8 weeks.

Other conditions that should be considered include periorificial dermatitis, keratosis pilaris, sebaceous hyperplasia and infections. Pyodermas and panniculitis should be considered in severe cases of inflammatory acne or in cases of acne conglobata while hyperandrogenism should be ruled out in cases of persistent infantile acne.

== Treatment ==
Infantile acne is a self-limiting condition that resolves by itself within 6–12 months of occurrence or occasionally by ages 4–5 and does not require treatment in most cases but topical therapies can be used, especially in more severe cases.

The goals of treatment are to reduce sebum production, prevent formation of microcomedones, suppress the growth of bacteria and reduce inflammation. As there are no US FDA approved medications for treatment of infantile acne due to lack of high quality trials in patients under 9, recommendations for treatment is based on observations in adult and adolescent populations.

=== Benzoyl peroxide ===
Benzoyl peroxide (BPO) is first line for mild cases of infantile acne due to its safety and effectiveness. BPO concentrates within cells of sebaceous follicles where it generates free radicals to oxidize proteins in bacteria such as P. acnes. This leads to bacterial death. It additionally works as a mild comedolytic and anti-inflammatory. No bacterial resistance has been reported from BPO usage and in fact it can help limit resistance to antibiotics. Common side effects include burning, stinging, scaling and dryness at the sight of application and can be managed by reducing quantity applied, frequency of application, using a less potent product and use of non-comedogenic moisturizers.

=== Retinoids ===
Topical retinoids both alone and in combination are also first line for treating mild to moderate cases of acne. Safety and efficacy has been demonstrated in individuals 12–18 years of age. Retinoids prevent formation of comedones and promote comedolysis by binding to retinoic receptors and normalizing growth of keratinocytes. Tretinoin and adapalene have demonstrated efficacy in reducing inflammation. Adapalene as a newer retinoid is thought to be more effective and better tolerated than others in this class. As a topical product, it has similar side effects to topical BPO of burning, stinging, drying and scaling which can be managed much the same way. Reducing the potency of initial treatment, using a non-comedogenic moisturizers, and applying a small amount on the whole face rather than spot-treating may reduce severity of side effects.

In severe cases, oral isotretinoin may be recommended to prevent scarring. Dosing ranges from 0.2 mg/kg/day to 2 mg/kg/day for several months to over a year with careful monitoring. Monitoring may include complete blood count with differential and baseline liver function and lipids tests followed by routine liver function and lipid tests while on treatment.

=== Antibiotics ===
==== Topical antibiotics ====
Topical antibiotics are often used in cases of inflammatory infantile acne in combination with another topical treatment to prevent emergence of antibiotic resistance especially for periods longer than a few weeks. Clindamycin and erythromycin are the most commonly prescribed topical antibiotics for acne with coverage for S. aureus and P. acnes. These bacteriostatic antibiotics interfere with bacterial protein synthesis, preventing formation of free fatty acids by these bacteria that cause inflammation.

==== Oral antibiotics ====
In severe cases of infantile acne, especially with the presence of nodules and cysts with risks of scarring, oral antibiotics may be used. First line therapy is erythromycin with sulfamethoxazole-trimethoprim as a secondary choice in cases of P. acnes resistance. It is suggested not to use tetracyclines due to risks of permanently staining teeth in children under the age of 7. Side effects of erythromycin include gastrointestinal upset. There has however been concerns about resistant P. acnes due to widespread usage of antibiotics, and therefore steps taken to minimize resistance such as use in combination with BPO is highly recommended by experts.

== Epidemiology ==
Infantile acne effects around 2% of children with a higher occurrence in males rather than females. Of around 9.2 million visits to outpatient care for pediatric acne, 3% or 276,000 visits, were due to neonatal and pediatric acne in the United States from 2000 to 2010.

== See also ==
- List of cutaneous conditions
- Neonatal acne
