= Cowdry bodies =

Micrograph of the cytopathic effects of herpes simplex on a cervical Pap test (Pap stain) including a Cowdry type A body at top. Other effects include multinucleation, nuclear molding and chromatin margination. Accompanying neutrophils are common but nonspecific.

Cowdry bodies are eosinophilic or basophilic nuclear inclusions composed of nucleic acid and protein seen in cells infected with Herpes simplex virus, Varicella-zoster virus, and Cytomegalovirus. They are named after Edmund Cowdry.

There are two types of intranuclear Cowdry bodies:

- Type A (as seen in herpes simplex and VZV)
- Type B (as seen in infection with poliovirus and CMV), though it may seem that this is an antiquated and perhaps illusory type.

Light microscopy is used for detection of Cowdry bodies.
