= Cytopathic effect =

Changes in cells caused by viruses

Micrograph of the cytopathic effects of herpes simplex on a cervical Pap test (Pap stain): multinucleation, nuclear molding, chromatin margination, and a Cowdry type A inclusion. Accompanying neutrophils are common but nonspecific.

Cytopathic effect (abbreviated CPE) refers to structural changes in host cells that are caused by viral invasion. If a virus causes these morphological changes in the host cell, it is said to be cytopathogenic. Common examples of CPE include rounding of the infected cell, fusion with adjacent cells to form syncytia, and the appearance of nuclear or cytoplasmic inclusion bodies.

CPEs and other changes in cell morphology are only a few of the many effects by cytocidal viruses. When a cytocidal virus infects a permissive cell, the viruses kill the host cell through changes in cell morphology, in cell physiology, and the biosynthetic events that follow. These changes are necessary for efficient virus replication but at the expense of the host cell. Ultimately, the infecting virus may cause lysis of the host cell or the cell dies without lysing due to its inability to replicate.

== Diagnostics ==
CPEs are important aspects of a viral infection in diagnostics. Many CPEs can be seen in unfixed, unstained cells under the low power of an optical microscope, with the condenser down and the iris diaphragm partly closed. However, with some CPEs, namely inclusion bodies, the cells must be fixed and stained then viewed under light microscopy. Some viruses' CPEs are characteristic and therefore can be an important tool for virologists in diagnosing an infected animal or human. The rate of CPE appearance is also an important characteristic that virologists may use to identify virus type. If CPE appears after 4 to 5 days in vitro at low multiplicity of infection, then the virus is considered slow. If the CPE appears after 1 to 2 days in vitro at low multiplicity of infection, then the virus is thought to be rapid. Inoculations always occur at low multiplicity of infection because at high multiplicity of infection, all CPEs occur rapidly.

Typically, the first sign of viral infections is the rounding of cells. Inclusion bodies often then appear in the cell nucleus and/or cytoplasm of the host cell. The inclusion bodies can first be identified by light microscopy in patient blood smears or stained sections of infected tissues. However, to fully characterize their composition, electron microscopy must be performed. Inclusion bodies may either be accumulation of virus replication byproducts or altered host cell organelles or structures.

Some viral infections cause a strange CPE, the formation of syncytia. Syncytia are large cytoplasmic masses that contain many nuclei. They are typically produced by fusion of infected cells. This mechanism is useful to the virus as it allows the virus to spread from infected to uninfected cells.

Viral infections may have clinically relevant phenotypical CPEs. For example, with the hepatitis C virus (HCV), liver steatosis is characteristic enough of the virus that it may be used to help identify the genotype, the genetic composition of the virus. HCV genotype 3 patients are significantly more likely to develop liver steatosis than those with genotype 1. Also, CPEs may be used during research to determine the efficacy of a new drug. An assay has been developed that screens the dengue virus's CPEs in order to assess cell viability.

Due to the host cell specificity of CPEs, researchers can also use them to test any discrepancies in an experiment. For many viral infections, different host cell strains may have a characteristic response. Currently, there are many concerns within the research community about the validity and purity of cell strains. Contamination has risen within and among laboratories. CPEs can be used to test the purity of a certain cell line. For example, HeLa CCL-2 is a common cell line used in a wide variety of research areas. To test the purity of the HeLa cells, CPEs were observed that occurred after inoculation with Coxsackievirus B3. These CPEs included morphology changes and cell morbidity rates. Carson et al. determined that the discrepancy is due to the heterogeneous nature of the commercial HeLa cells as compared to the homogeneous nature of HeLa cells that have been propagated for generations in a lab.

== Common types ==
=== Total destruction ===
Total destruction of the host cell monolayer is the most severe type of CPE. To observe this process, cells are seeded on a glass surface and a confluent monolayer of host cell is formed. Then, the viral infection is introduced. All cells in the monolayer shrink rapidly, become dense in a process known as pyknosis, and detach from the glass within three days. This form of CPE is typically seen with enteroviruses.

=== Subtotal destruction ===
Subtotal destruction of the host cell monolayer is less severe than total destruction. Similarly to total destruction, this CPE is observed by seeding a confluent monolayer of host cell on a glass surface then introducing a viral infection. Subtotal destruction characteristically shows detachment of some but not all the cells in the monolayer. It is commonly observed with some togaviruses, some picornaviruses, and some types of paramyxoviruses.

=== Focal degeneration ===
Focal degeneration causes a localized attack of the host cell monolayer. Although this type of CPE may eventually affect the entire tissue, the initial stages and spreading occur at localized viral centers known as foci. Focal degeneration is due to direct cell-to-cell transfer of the virus rather than diffusion through the extracellular medium. This different mode of transfer differentiates it from total and subtotal destruction and causes the characteristic localized effects. Initially, host cells become enlarged, rounded, and refractile. Eventually, the host cells detach from the surface. The spreading of the virus occurs concentrically, so that the cells lifting off are surrounded by enlarged, rounded cells that are surrounded by healthy tissue. This type of CPE is characteristic of herpesviruses and poxviruses.

=== Swelling and clumping ===
Swelling and clumping is a CPE where host cells swell significantly. Once enlarged, the cells clump together in clusters. Eventually, the cells become so large that they detach. This type of CPE is characteristic of adenoviruses.

=== Foamy degeneration ===
Foamy degeneration is also known as vacuolization. It is due to the formation of large and/or numerous cytoplasmic vacuoles. This type of CPE can only be observed with fixation and staining of the host cells involved. Foamy degeneration is characteristic of certain retroviruses, paramyxoviruses, and flaviviruses.

=== Syncytium ===
Syncytium is also known as cell fusion and polykaryon formation. With this CPE, the plasma membranes of four or more host cells fuse and produce an enlarged cell with at least four nuclei. Although large cell fusions are sometimes visible without staining, this type of CPE is typically detected after host cell fixation and staining. Herpesviruses characteristically produce cell fusion as well as other forms of CPE. Some paramyxoviruses may be identified through the formation of cell fusion as they exclusively produce this CPE.

=== Inclusion bodies ===
Inclusion bodies – insoluble abnormal structures within cell nuclei or cytoplasm – may only be seen with staining as they indicate areas of altered staining in the host cells. Typically, they indicate the areas of the host cell where viral protein or nucleic acid is being synthesized or where virions are being assembled. Also, in some cases, inclusion bodies are present without an active virus and indicate areas of viral scarring. Inclusion bodies vary with viral strain. They may be single or multiple, small or large, and round or irregularly shaped. They may also be intranuclear or intracytoplasmic and eosinophilic or basophilic.

== See also ==
- Indirect immunoperoxidase assay
- Viral culture
- Virus
