= Nuclear moulding =

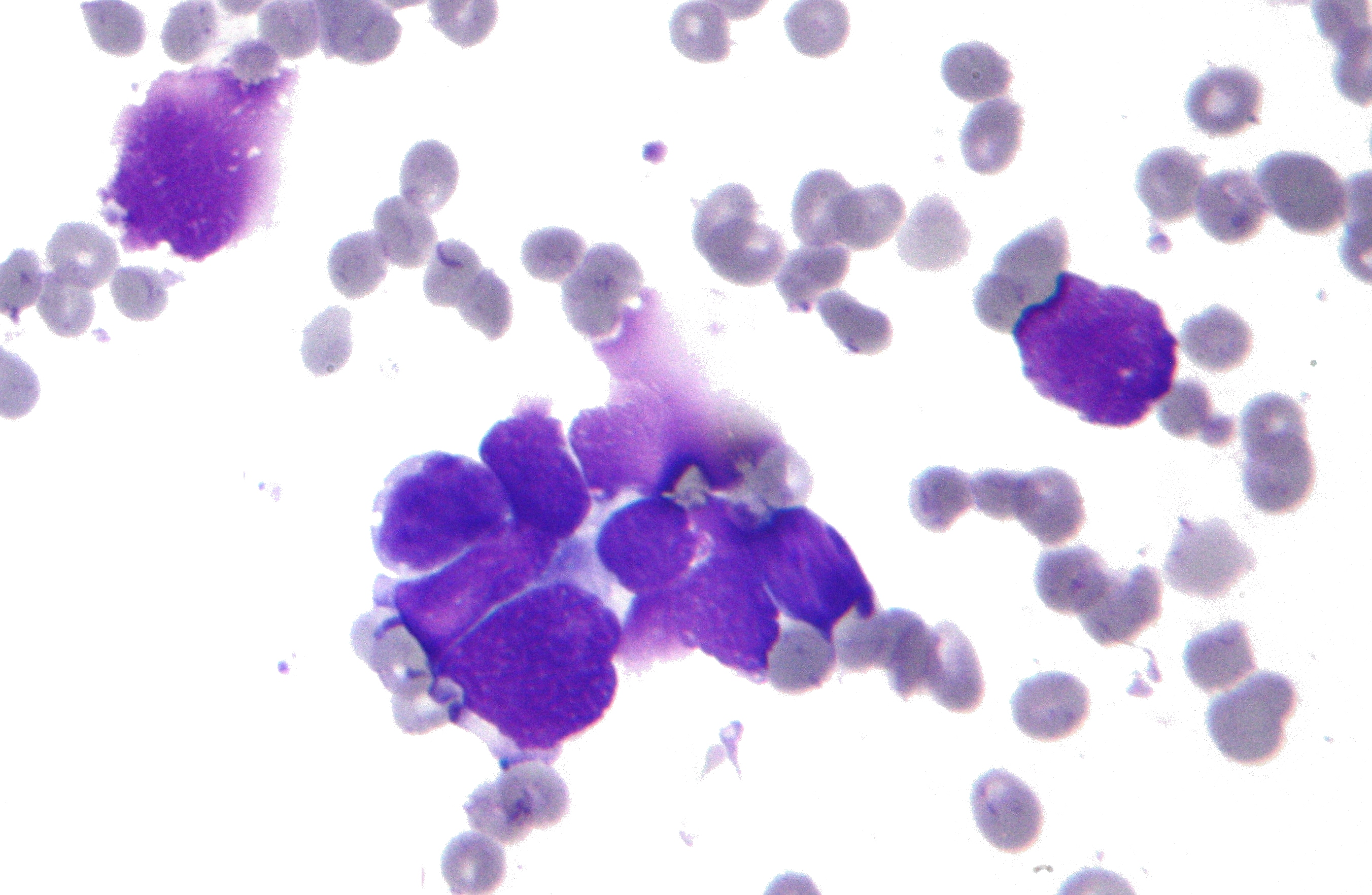
Micrograph of a small cell carcinoma showing cells with nuclear moulding. FNA specimen. Field stain.

Micrograph of the cytopathic effects of herpes simplex on a cervical Pap test (Pap stain): multinucleation, nuclear molding, chromatin margination, and a Cowdry type A inclusion. Accompanying neutrophils are common but nonspecific.

In histopathology, nuclear moulding, also nuclear molding, is conformity of adjacent cell nuclei to one another.

It is a feature of small cell carcinomas and particularly useful for differentiation of small cell and non-small cell carcinomas, i.e. adenocarcinoma and squamous carcinoma.

== See also ==
- Merkel cell carcinoma
- Lung cancer
