= Infantile acropustulosis =

- Other names: Acropustulosis of infancy
- Specialty: Dermatology

Infantile acropustulosis is an intensely itchy vesicopustular eruption of the hands and feet. Involvement of scabies has been suggested.

== See also ==
- Acropustulosis
- List of cutaneous conditions
