= Sucking blister =

Skin condition in newborn babies

Sucking blisters are a cutaneous condition on newborns that is present on their extremities at birth. This is not to be confused with sucking pads, which are similar in appearance. Sucking blisters are due to natural neonatal sucking reflexes on the affected areas in utero. These sucking blisters become present at birth when the sucking movements are very aggressive while in the uterus. These blisters are commonly found on the newborn's arms, fingers, or any body part they are able to suck on. It is a very rare condition, seen in less than 1% of newborns. It is difficult to diagnose because its appearance can be mistaken as other skin conditions. Diagnosis is usually done by eliminating other possible cutaneous conditions. This process of elimination includes examining blood culture, lesions, and inflammatory markers. This skin condition is usually self-inflicted, benign and can heal on its own. Sucking blisters do typically not require medical treatment and disappear within a week.

== Signs and symptoms ==
A fetus robustly sucking on areas such as forearm, fingers and hands while in utero can cause a blister on those affected areas presenting at birth, with a diameter ranging from 0.5 centimeters to 1.5 centimeters. The blisters commonly happen on one side of the involved area but in some cases, they are on both extremities. However, there is no difference in the severity of the condition with regard to how many extremities the blisters are present on. Continued sucking would cause the blister to rupture so in some cases newborns will present with a denuded skin while others' blisters stay intact at birth. The fluid inside the blister is clear, yellowish and shows negative results on bacterial cultures. Sucking blister is considered a noninfectious condition and is usually not harmful.

There are limited resources of this skin condition in any textbook about pediatric patients and skin conditions, which explains the unfamiliarity in practice of pediatricians or dermatologists. Providers must determine the diagnosis of sucking blisters based on the information available on the presentation of other congenital blistering conditions to successfully rule them out. Understanding the causes and manifestations of both simple and complex skin damage and conditions will help providers address the issue and provide care. According to its characteristic as a non-serious and self-limiting condition, providers can avoid any unnecessary diagnostic procedures and treatments for the newborns, if it is sucking blister, which can relieve the anxiety for the parents of newborns.

There have also been reports of sucking blisters forming on the lips, which is very uncommon in comparison to the typical locations of blisters on extremities. Treatment for the blisters on this rare location is similar to any other affected area of sucking blister.

== Clinical studies and case reports ==
=== Case reports on extremities ===
A newborn who was born to a 26-year-old Caucasian women at the 41st week of gestation was seen with 2 round erosions on the left wrist in the postpartum examination. Both mother and baby were healthy with no history of infection and skin abnormalities. The sucking was even observed during the examination of the affected area. There was no treatment prescribed and the lesion was resolved after several days.

Another newborn who was born to 34-year-old woman via untraumatic natural delivery at her 39th week of gestation was seen with an erosion on her left forearm via examination happening just after birth. No abnormalities were detected during the pregnancy and the mother was healthy. After one week, her lesion was spontaneously healed without any treatment.

Another newborn was detected with a lesion on the left wrist with its diameter of 1.5 centimeters x 1 centimeters. There was no relevant history regarding the mother's or neonate's health condition during gestation to explain the cause of this lesion. Parents of the newborn were frustrated and anxious because their baby got this skin condition right after birth. During examination, the newborn did show sucking of the affected area which helped to ease their parents that the blister happened in the womb. No treatment was given, however, an intervention helped the lesion resolve in six weeks. The intervention involved the use of a dummy for the baby to suck on in between bottle feeds. This was to prevent the baby to suck on their own hand, and allow the wound to stay clean and dry for proper healing.

=== Rare case report of blister on the lips ===
A newborn, who was born at the 38th week of gestation, was seen with blisters on both lips during a physical examination happening right after birth. The condition was resolved only after 1 day without any medical intervention. Sucking blisters are not to be confused with leukoedema or sucking pads, as these both are often found on the baby's lips, thumb, or arm, and may be due to the sucking mechanism of the baby. Sucking pads are usually found on the border of the lips, specifically towards the inside of the mouth when looking at the line of the lip. Sucking pads, similar to sucking blister, are also caused by the sucking mechanism of the neonate in utero. However, sucking pads can take three to six months to disappear, whereas sucking blisters may resolve itself within a week. Another similarity with sucking blisters and sucking pads are that they both have bullae with fluids inside and are both benign conditions that may not need treatment.

Demographic data

There was a prospective cohort descriptive study conducted on one thousand newborns born from September 2015 to 2016 in Northeast Thailand to try and identify any types of skin conditions during their first five days post-birth. The most common skin conditions were Mongolian spots, found in 66.7% of the newborns, and sebaceous gland hyperplasia, found in 60.9% of the newborns. The study classified sucking blister in the "miscellaneous cutaneous conditions." Sucking blister was found in 10/1000 newborns which is about 1% of the study population. Other miscellaneous cutaneous conditions in the study were aplasia cutis (0.2%), nevus sebaceous (1.2%), epidermal nevus (0.4%), and bullous impetigo (0.8%).

== Diagnosis ==
Skin conditions can appear and are commonplace during a baby's first months of life, with reports of up to 95% of newborns having some sort of skin finding. With such a high incidence of potential skin conditions on newborns, doctors must be able to differentiate between more severe skin conditions and benign ones. Successfully deciphering the differences between the various types of disease states will depend on how the blisters look, the presence or lack of other blisters, and when they appear on the skin. Sucking blisters are often diagnosed using a process of elimination. Neonatal sucking blisters can be infectious and noninfectious. To check for infection, the process includes examining the neonate's body for signs of inflammation, purulent discharge, or lesions. If there is no presence of those features and the neonate seems generally healthy, it is safe to suggest it is a sucking blister, and not an infection. If there are a lot of lesions, regardless of sepsis present, that can be a sign that the lesions are not sucking blisters. Furthermore, the lack of formation of new blisters also supports the diagnosis of sucking blisters. Due to this skin condition being so rare, this makes it difficult on clinicians to diagnose, especially those who are unfamiliar with sucking blisters specifically. It is helpful for clinicians to be aware of the neonates' skin maturation and physiological process to correctly diagnose and treat skin conditions.

In neonatal populations, sucking blisters are usually caused by the neonate themselves from sucking on their extremities while in the uterus. Neonates can be seen continuously sucking on the affected area outside the uterus. If the child doesn't appear to have any infectious or other skin conditions, the diagnosis of sucking blister is made. Certain characteristics, such as the location of blisters on the upper limbs and the blisters clearing on their own in a few weeks, also support this diagnosis.

A 1963 review estimated that every 1 in 250 children born had sucking blisters, but recent experts in the field think this number is even lower.

== Pathophysiology ==
There are certain primitive reflexes that newborns possess when they are still in the womb. The ones that aid successfully feeding an infant by bottle or on the breast later are rooting and sucking reflex. It is believed that the fetus practices sucking while in the womb, which explains the action of thumb or hand sucking detected by ultrasound, observed from eighteenth to the twenty-fourth weeks of gestation, and fully developed at the 36th week of pregnancy. Frequency of sucking activity will increase toward the end of the pregnancy due to the impact of completed development of taste buds. A study in 1985 about physiology of sucking suggested that failing of initiating normally sucking at the expected time period of the pregnancy or showing any uncoordinated sucking movement might be a sign for an underlying neurologic condition in neonates. There was no case report presenting any correlation of sucking blister and thumbs sucking after birth or any dental abnormalities condition later.

Sucking blister is caused by the fetus forcefully sucking on an accessible area of their body, typically an upper extremity, but potentially toes as well. Neonatal skin is extremely sensitive to this sucking action since the skin barrier has yet to mature. In fact, the dermis does not mature until well into infancy. Because it is not mature, the skin does not have the same protective structure as that of an adult and is more susceptible to physical damage. This damage to the outer layer of the skin results in the formation of a blister. A newborn's skin starts with the vernix caseosa, which looks like a pasty, lipophilic substance. This vernix caseosa is important for newborns as they provide multiple functions such as prevention of water loss, skin hydration, temperature regulation, and assistance with innate immunity.

Besides the damaged outer layer of skin, sucking blisters can also present with fluid buildup. Bursting of this fluid-filled blister results in the red, sensitive area as seen in the image above. Fluid initially collects between the epidermis and dermis in order to protect the deeper tissues and promote healing.

== Treatment ==
Neonatal blistering can be caused by various reasons. If not properly treated or left untreated, they can potentially cause major harm to the baby or even death. Neonatal blistering is most commonly caused by infections, so the presence of blistering should be followed by testing of blister fluid to confirm infection. If there is an infection, the initiation of antimicrobial medications is typically started. In order to ensure the neonate has an infection, a blood sample is taken. In the blood sample, clinicians will look at full blood count, C reactive protein, and blood culture. C-reactive protein levels are typically elevated when there are signs of inflammation. Because sucking blisters result from excessive sucking of the area by the fetus, rather than bacterial, antiviral, or hereditary causes, these blisters can resolve themselves without specific medication treatment within a few days to weeks.

Due to the drastic changes that the neonate experiences going from inside the uterus to the outside world, careful skin management and practices are recommended, especially if there are skin conditions present. The management of a blister will differ based on its clinical features. For the management of closed blisters, moisturizer can be applied after the skin is cleaned with gentle cleanser and warm water. Open blisters may require a wound dressing to cover them, with the dressing type and frequency of changes needed, varying with blister fluid levels. Large blisters should first be cleaned with alcohol and extracted for blister fluid if present; otherwise, gauze and pads can be used to act as a cover over the area as protection against outside sources. Regular bathing of the infant is crucial in preventing the development of an infection at the open blister, and salt can be added to the water to reduce pain associated with the blister.

== See also ==
- List of cutaneous conditions
