= Multinucleate cell =

Eukaryotic cell with multiple nuclei

A multinucleate cell (also known as multinucleated cell or polynuclear cell) is a eukaryotic cell that has more than one nucleus, i.e., multiple nuclei share one common cytoplasm. Mitosis in multinucleate cells can occur either in a coordinated, synchronous manner where all nuclei divide simultaneously or asynchronously where individual nuclei divide independently in time and space. Certain organisms may have a multinuclear stage of their life cycle. For example, slime molds have a vegetative, multinucleate life stage called a plasmodium.

Multinucleate cells, depending on the mechanism by which they are formed, can be divided into "syncytia" (formed by cell fusion) or "coenocytes" (formed by nuclear division not followed by cytokinesis).

Some bacteria, such as Mycoplasma pneumoniae, a pathogen of the respiratory tract, may display multinuclear filaments as a result of a delay between genome replication and cellular division. Here, multinuclear filaments refer to multiple nucleoids within the same cytoplasm, as bacteria are prokaryotic.

== Terminology ==
Some biologists use the potentially misleading term "acellular" to refer to multinucleate cell forms (syncitia and coenocytes), such as to differentiate "acellular" slime molds from the purely "cellular" ones (which do not form such structures).

Some use the term "syncytium" in a wide sense, to mean any type of multinucleate cell, while others differentiate the terms for each type.

== Physiological examples ==
=== Syncytia ===
Syncytia are multinuclear cells that can form either through normal biological processes, such as the mammalian placenta, or under the influence of certain pathogens, such as HIV, via fusion of the plasma membrane. Other examples include the skeletal muscle cells of mammals, the tapetal cells of plants, and the storage cells of Douglas-fir seeds. The polymorphonuclear leukocytes of mammals are not polynuclear cells, although the lobes of their nuclei are so deeply bifurcated that they can appear so under non-optimal microscopy.

Osteoclasts are multinuclear cells that are found commonly in the human body that aid in the maintenance and repair of the bones by secreting acid that dissolves bone matter. They are typically found to have 5 nuclei per cell, due to the fusion of preosteoclasts.

The chlorarachniophytes form multinucleate cells by fusion, being syncytia and not coenocytes. This syncytia is called plasmodium, in the sense of a multinucleate protoplast without a cell wall which exhibits amoeboid movement. Other examples include some plasmodiophorids, some haplosporidians, and the grex of cellular slime moulds (dictyostelids and acrasids).

==== Placenta ====
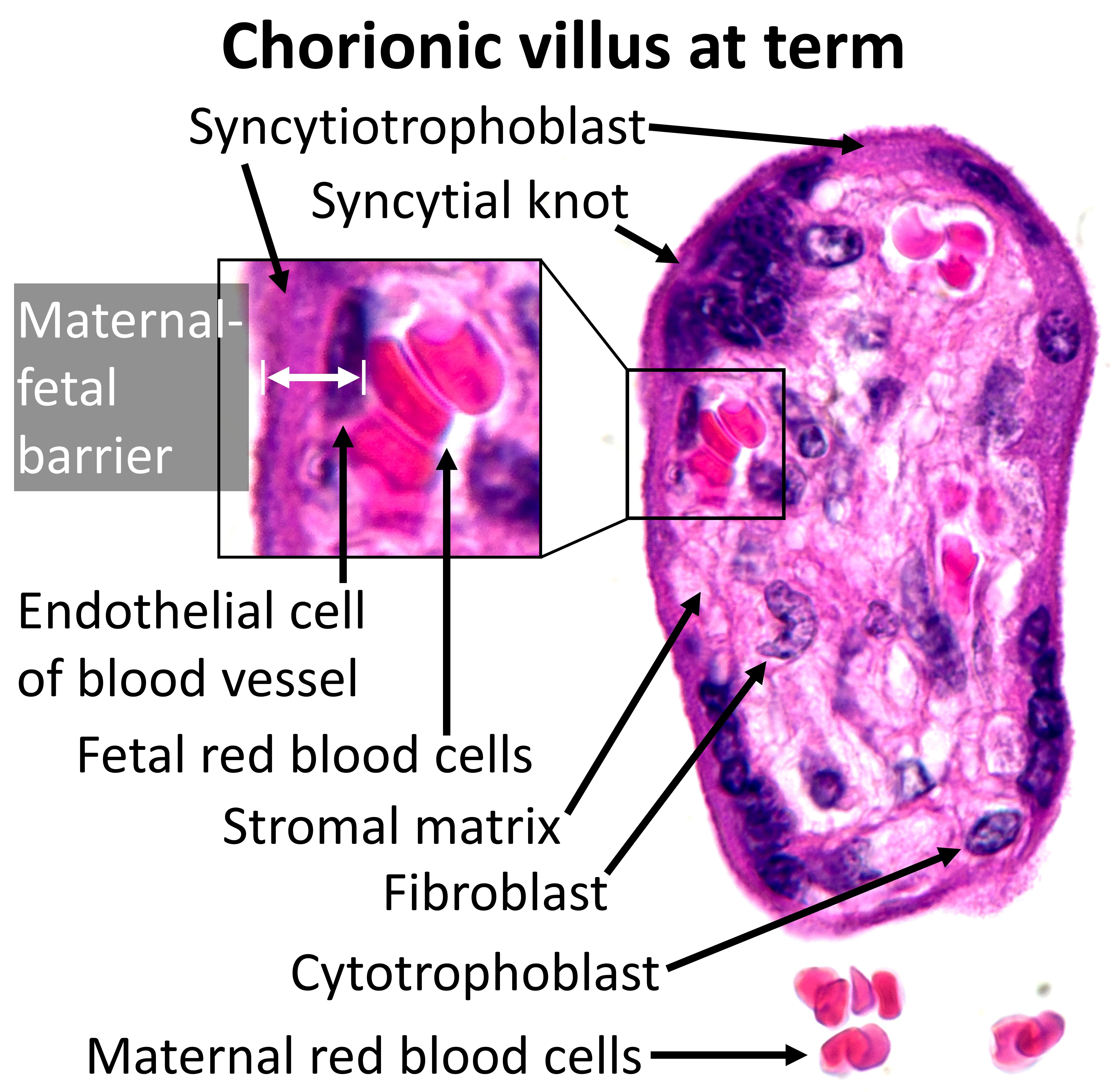
High-magnification H&E micrograph of a cross-section of a chorionic villus of the placenta, showing its coverage by a continuous multinucleated syncytiotrophoblast, including a focal aggregation of syncytial nuclei termed a syncytial knot.

The placenta, a temporary organ that transports nutrients, oxygen, waste, and other materials between a mother and a developing fetus, is partially composed of a syncytial layer that forms the interface between the fetus and the mother. In addition to performing simple interface duties, the placental syncytia also acts as a barrier to infection from viruses, bacteria, and protozoa, which is likely due to unique cytoskeletal properties of these cells.

=== Coenocytes ===
Furthermore, multinucleate cells are produced from specialized cell cycles in which nuclear division occurs without cytokinesis, thus leading to large coenocytes or plasmodia. In filamentous fungi, multinucleate cells may extend over hundreds of meters so that different regions of a single cell experience dramatically different microenvironments. Other examples include, the plasmodia of plasmodial slime molds (myxogastrids) and the schizont of the Plasmodium parasite which causes malaria.

== Pathological examples ==
Micrograph of the cytopathic effects of herpes simplex on a cervical Pap test (Pap stain) including multinucleation. Other effects include nuclear molding, chromatin margination, and a Cowdry type A inclusion. Accompanying neutrophils are common but nonspecific.

Multinucleated cells can also occur under pathological conditions as the consequence of a disturbed cell cycle control (e.g., some binucleated cells and metastasizing tumor cells).

=== Human Immunodeficiency Virus ===
As previously mentioned, syncytia may be induced through the actions of HIV, where T-cells are fused by the action of virus-derived proteins on the cell membrane. During viral replication in T lymphoid cells, large amounts of viral envelope Glycoprotein (Env) are synthesized and trafficked to the cell membrane where they can be incorporated into new virus particles. However, some of the Env molecules interact with neighboring T-cell receptors, which brings the cells into close enough proximity to enable trigger events culminating in the fusion of two host cells, likely due to the close contact of the two plasma membranes. This interaction is likely specific to CD4+ T-cells, as cells lacking this receptor were unable to form syncytia in laboratory conditions.

== Not multinucleate ==
Although not normally viewed as a case of multinucleation, plant cells share a common cytoplasm by plasmodesmata, and most cells in animal tissues are in communication with their neighbors via gap junctions.

Although endosymbiosis among eukaryotes can result in multiple nuclei in a cell, these are not considered "multinucleate" because the nuclei are not surrounded by the same cytoplasm. These extra nuclei are called nucleomorphs.
