= Erythema toxicum neonatorum =

Benign rash occurring in infants

- Other names: Erythema toxicum, Urticaria neonatorum and Toxic erythema of the newborn
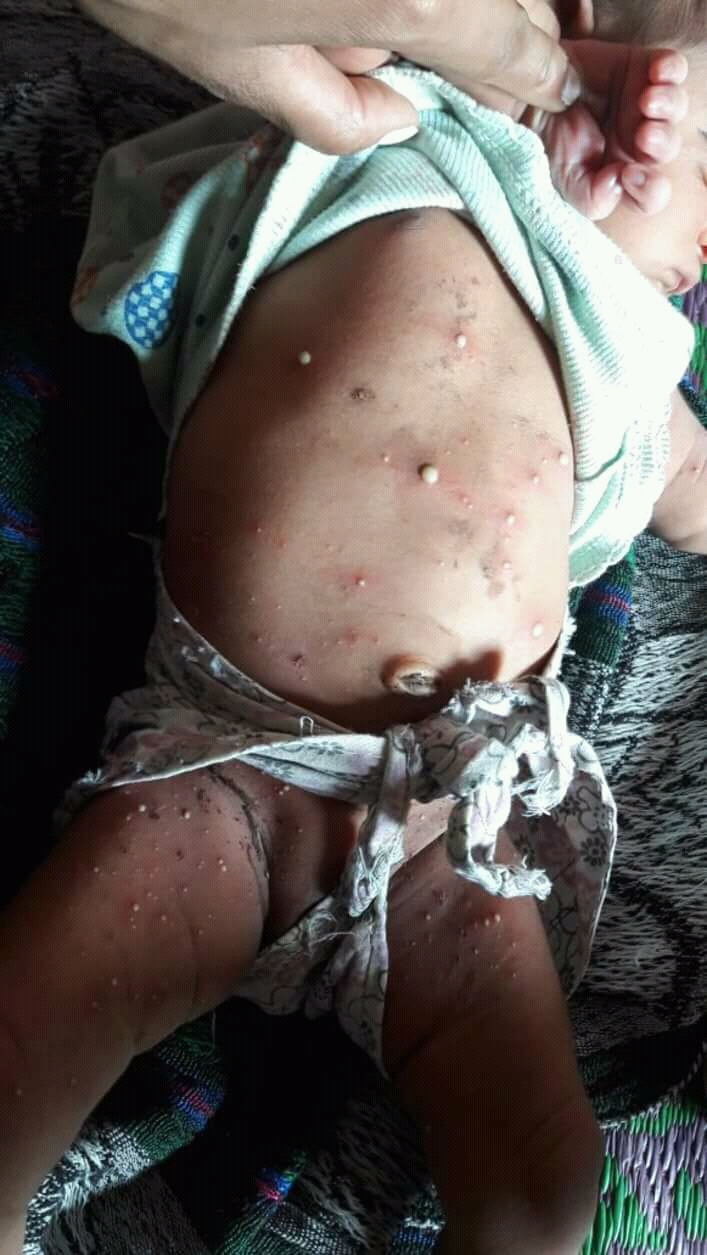
- Specialty: Pediatrics

Erythema toxicum neonatorum is a common, non-threatening rash in newborns. It appears in 40-70% of newborns within the first week of life, and it typically improves within 1–2 weeks. It only occurs during the newborn period, but may appear slightly later in premature babies. The rash has a variable appearance. It typically includes blotchy red spots, often with overlying firm, yellow-white bumps or pus-filled boils. There may be only a few or many lesions. The lesions can appear almost anywhere on the body, and individual lesions may appear and disappear within hours. There are no other symptoms associated with erythema toxicum neonatorum, and the rash does not have any long-term effects on the skin. Erythema toxicum neonatorum is not harmful and does not require any treatment.

== Epidemiology ==
The exact prevalence of erythema toxicum neonatorum is unknown, and studies estimate prevalence as low as 3.7 percent to as high as 72 percent. It is one of the most commonly diagnosed rashes in healthy babies. It is more common among infants born at higher gestational age and is rare among premature infants. Erythema toxicum neonatorum is more likely to develop in infants delivered vaginally. Higher birth weight is an additional risk factor. There may be a slightly increased risk in males, but this association is unclear. There are no known associations with race or ethnicity.

== Presentation ==
Erythema toxicum neonatorum usually appears during the first week of life, most often on day two. It may develop several days or weeks later in premature babies.

The rash has a variable appearance, ranging from a few blotchy red spots to many yellow-white bumps and boils. The classic presentation is 1–3 mm, firm, yellow-white bumps with a surrounding red halo. The rash is often described as "flea-bitten." There may be only a few or many lesions, and they may be clustered or widespread. The rash often appears on the cheeks first and may later spread throughout the face, trunk, arms, and legs. Lesions most often appear on the thighs, buttocks, and trunk. The palms and soles are not affected, likely because the skin in these areas does not have hair follicles.

Individual lesions may grow and shrink over hours or days. They usually fade within a week or two. The rash may recur within the next few weeks, but this is rare.

== Cause ==
Erythema toxicum neonatorum is related to activation of the immune system, but its exact cause is unknown. Many inflammatory factors have been detected in erythema toxicum neonatorum lesions, including IL-1alpha, IL-1beta, IL-8, and eotaxin. These molecules cause redness and swelling in the skin and attract immune cells.

Eosinophils and other immune cells are found in the upper layer of the skin in erythema toxicum neonatorum lesions. Immune cells tend to cluster around hair follicles in particular. The leading hypothesis about the cause of erythema toxicum neonatorum is that bacteria activate the immune system when they enter hair follicles for the first time. This is part of a normal process in which bacteria from the environment start to grow on a baby's skin. It is unknown whether the immune response that causes erythema toxicum neonatorum is helpful to the baby. Recent research indicates an association with Demodex mites infestation (demodicosis).

== Diagnosis and Differential Diagnosis ==
Health professionals can diagnose erythema toxicum neonatorum with a skin exam. Most cases of erythema toxicum neonatorum can be diagnosed without further testing. If more testing is needed to make a diagnosis, the contents of a lesion can be examined under a microscope. A health professional may make a small cut into a pus-filled lesion and collect a swab of pus for testing. Lesions caused by erythema toxicum neonatorum contain eosinophils and other immune cells. These cells can be seen under a microscope when a special stain is applied to the sample.

Since the appearance of erythema toxicum neonatorum varies, it may be confused with other newborn rashes. Some newborn infections cause bumps or boils, which may look like erythema toxicum neonatorum. Bacterial infections, including Staphylococcus and Streptococcus infections, almost always cause additional symptoms. These symptoms may be severe, and they are usually not limited to rash. Bacterial rashes can be diagnosed by testing pus from a lesion along with a blood sample. Bacteria can be seen under a microscope with a special stain or may be found on a culture. Fungal infection with Candida may also cause a similar rash in newborns, but it usually causes additional symptoms like thrush. Similarly, fungus can be seen under a microscope or found on a culture. Some viral infections may cause a rash with boils on a reddish base. Rashes caused by herpes simplex virus and varicella zoster virus in particular may be confused with erythema toxicum neonatorum. These viruses are diagnosed by scraping the base of a lesion. Multinucleated giant cells can be seen under a microscope. Some of these tests may be ordered if the diagnosis is unclear.

== Treatment ==
Erythema toxicum neonatorum resolves without treatment, typically within one or two weeks. There are no associated systemic symptoms or long-term consequences of the rash.

== History ==
The rash of erythema toxicum neonatorum has been described by doctors for centuries. Ancient Mesopotamians believed that it represented a cleansing mechanism against the mother's blood. Later physicians believed that it was caused by the skin's response to meconium. The name erythema toxicum neonatorum was first used by Dr. Karl Leiner in 1912 because he believed that the rash was caused by enterotoxins. Although Leiner's hypothesis was incorrect and the rash is not actually caused by toxins, the medical community continues to call the rash erythema toxicum neonatorum.
