= List of Guggenheim Fellowships awarded in 1952 =

One hundred and ninety-one scholars, artists, and scientists received Guggenheim Fellowships in 1952. $860,000 was disbursed between the recipients. The University of California system had the most awardees on its faculty (20), followed by Yale University (10).

== 1952 U.S. and Canadian Fellows ==
Category	Field of Study	Fellow	Institutional association	Research topic	Notes	Ref
Creative Arts	Fiction	Hortense Calisher		Writing	Also won in 1955	
Creative Arts	Fiction	André Giroux	Quebec Department of Trade and Commerce	Writing		
Creative Arts	Fiction	William Goyen		Half a Look of Cain: A Fantastical Narrative (published 1998)	Also won in 1951	
Creative Arts	Fiction	Vladimir Nabokov	Cornell University	Writing	Also won in 1943	
Creative Arts	Fiction	Byron Herbert Reece		The Ax and the Sword	Also won in 1957	
Creative Arts	Fiction	Wallace Stegner	Stanford University	Biographical studies of John Wesley Powell	Also won in 1949 and 1959	
Creative Arts	Fine Arts	Saul Baizerman		Sculpture		
Creative Arts	Fine Arts	Wilfred Roloff Beny		Painting		
Creative Arts	Fine Arts	Morris Atkinson Blackburn	Pennsylvania Academy of the Fine Arts	Painting		
Creative Arts	Fine Arts	Stuart Davis		Painting		
Creative Arts	Fine Arts	Worden Day		Printmaking processes	Also won in 1961	
Creative Arts	Fine Arts	Ynez Johnston		Painting		
Creative Arts	Fine Arts	Misch Kohn	Institute of Design, Chicago	Wood engraving	Also won in 1953	
Creative Arts	Fine Arts	Eugene Mondt Powell		Painting		
Creative Arts	Fine Arts	Janet E. Turner	Stephen F. Austin State College	Wildlife themes		
Creative Arts	Music Composition	Bryan Dority		Composing	Also won in 1953	
Creative Arts	Music Composition	Lou Silver Harrison	Black Mountain College	Composing	Also won in 1954	
Creative Arts	Music Composition	Lockrem Harold Johnson		Composing		
Creative Arts	Music Composition	Robert Kurka	City College of New York	Composing	Also won in 1951	
Creative Arts	Music Composition	Charles M. Mills		Composing		
Creative Arts	Music Composition	Robert Moffat Palmer	Cornell University	Composing	Also won in 1960	
Creative Arts	Music Composition	Howard Swanson		Composing		
Creative Arts	Music Composition	Ben Brian Weber		Composing	Also won in 1950	
Creative Arts	Photography	Roy Rudolph DeCarava		Life in Harlem		
Creative Arts	Poetry	Robert Stuart Fitzgerald		Writing	Also won in 1971	
Creative Arts	Poetry	Adrienne C. Rich		Writing	Also won in 1959	
Creative Arts	Poetry	Richard Purdy Wilbur	Harvard University	Writing	Also won in 1963	
Humanities	American Literature	Gay Wilson Allen	New York University	Walt Whitman	Also won in 1959	
Humanities	American Literature	James Franklin Beard, Jr.	Dartmouth College	Letters and papers of James Fenimore Cooper	Also won in 1958	
Humanities	American Literature	Everett Carter	University of California, Berkeley	Age of realism in American letters	Also won in 1961	
Humanities	American Literature	Thomas H. Johnson	Lawrenceville School	Writings of Emily Dickinson		
Humanities	Architecture, Planning and Design	William Jordy	Yale University	Effects of the concept of the "City Beautiful" on city planning in the US		
Humanities	Architecture, Planning and Design	Elizabeth R. Sunderland	Duke University	The Charlieu Abbey in ancient Burgundy		
Humanities	Bibliography	Allen Tracy Hazen	Columbia University	The library of Horace Walpole		
Humanities	Biography	John Berryman	University of Cincinnati	Writing	Also won in 1966 (for poetry)	
Humanities	Classics	Lionel Casson	New York University	Maritime commerce in Greek and Roman times	Also won in 1959	
Humanities	Classics	Solomon Katz	University of Washington	Bithynia as a client kingdom of the Roman Empire		
Humanities	Classics	James Anastasios Notopoulos	Trinity College	Homer as an oral poet		
Humanities	Classics	Brooks Otis	Hobart College	The originality of Roman thought	Also won in 1973	
Humanities	Classics	Carl Angus Roebuck	University of Chicago	Economic and social development of the Ionian Greeks		
Humanities	Classics	Lily Ross Taylor	Bryn Mawr College	Roman politics in the last two centuries of the Republic	Also won in 1959	
Humanities	Classics	Leon Edward Wright	Howard University	Healing miracles of the New Testament and their value for modern life		
Humanities	East Asian Studies	Ferdinand Lessing	University of California, Berkeley	Tibetan Buddhist symbolism	Also won in 1955	
Humanities	Education	Robert King Hall	Columbia University	Comparative education	Also won in 1945 and 1949	
Humanities	English Literature	F. Michael Krouse	University of Cincinnati	Milton's part, and that of his adversaries, in the controversies following the execution of Charles I of England		
Humanities	English Literature	Frederick A. Pottle	Yale University	Biographical studies of James Boswell	Also won in 1945	
Humanities	English Literature	James Kester Svendsen	University of Oklahoma	Place of science in Milton's thought and art		
Humanities	English Literature	Aline Mackenzie Taylor	Tulane University	Forms of acting on the English stage in the 18th century		
Humanities	Fine Arts Research	Louise H. Burchfield	Cleveland Museum of Art	History, techniques, and aesthetics of the portrait miniature		
Humanities	Fine Arts Research	Julius S. Held	Barnard College	Drawings of the Flemish painters	Also won in 1966	
Humanities	Fine Arts Research	George Kubler	Yale University	Architecture of the Spanish and Portuguese empires	Also won in 1943 and 1956	
Humanities	Fine Arts Research	Phyllis Williams Lehmann	Smith College	Greek cult buildings of the Hellenistic Age		
Humanities	Fine Arts Research	Ralph Mayer		Permanence of casein painting		
Humanities	Fine Arts Research	Marvin Chauncey Ross	Walters Art Gallery	Seth Eastman	Also won in 1938, 1939, and 1948	
Humanities	Fine Arts Research	Libby Tannenbaum	Museum of Modern Art	Development of modern art in the 20th century		
Humanities	Folklore and Popular Culture	Arthur Leon Campa	Denver University	Spanish legends in the American Southwest		
Humanities	Folklore and Popular Culture	Wayland D. Hand	University of California, Los Angeles	Dictionary of American popular beliefs and superstitions	Also won in 1960	
Humanities	French History	George P. Cuttino	Swarthmore College and Bryn Mawr College	History of European culture	Also won in 1944	
Humanities	French History	Richard Wilder Emery	Queens College	Credit and trade in southern France, 1250-1350	Also won in 1959	
Humanities	French History	Franklin Lewis Ford	Bennington College	History of Strasbourg under the Old Regime		
Humanities	French History	J. Russell Major	Emory University	Estates General of France	Also won in 1967	
Humanities	French Literature	Imbrie Buffum	Yale University	Baroque style in French literature, 1570-1650		
Humanities	French Literature	Donald Murdoch Frame	Columbia University	Development of Montaigne's thought		
Humanities	General Nonfiction	John Edward Pfeiffer		Recent theories of the evolution of the universe	Also won in 1954	
Humanities	General Nonfiction	Roderick Seidenberg		Processes of change in human society		
Humanities	German and East European History	William Clarence Askew	Colgate University	Relations of Italy with the Great Powers, 1896-1914		
Humanities	German and Scandinavian Literature	Henry C. Hatfield	Columbia University	Rise of paganism in German literature		
Humanities	History of Science and Technology	Charles Donald O'Malley	Stanford University	Biographical studies of Andreas Vesalius		
Humanities	Italian History	Felix Gilbert	Bryn Mawr College	Political and historical ideas in Italy, 1494-1530		
Humanities	Latin American History	Charles Gibson	State University of Iowa	Valley of Mexico peoples in colonial times		
Humanities	Linguistics	Giuliano Ugo Bonfante	Princeton University	Linguistic studies of hieroglyphic Hittite		
Humanities	Literary Criticism	Frederick Wilcox Dupee	Columbia University	Biographical studies of European and American writers, 1900-1950		
Humanities	Literary Criticism	Renato Poggioli	Harvard University	Tragedy and the sense of the tragic		
Humanities	Literary Criticism	René Wellek	Yale University	History of literary criticism	Also won in 1951, 1956, and 1966	
Humanities	Medieval Literature	George R. Coffman	University of North Carolina	The conservative middle class of 14th-century England, centering on John Gower		
Humanities	Medieval Literature	Kathrine Koller Diez	University of Rochester	Relationship between literature and changes in English thought in the 17th century		
Humanities	Medieval Literature	Francis Lee Utley	Ohio State University	Apocryphal stories of the flood, derived and amplified from the Biblical text	Also won in 1946 and 1947	
Humanities	Medieval Literature	Alice Sperduti Wilson	Smith College	Petrarch's views on poetry, as precursors of Renaissance literary criticism		
Humanities	Music Research	Donald Jay Grout	Cornell University	Early 16th-century church music	Also won in 1951	
Humanities	Philosophy	Rudolf Carnap	University of Chicago	Boundary field between logic and mathematics		
Humanities	Philosophy	Roderick Firth	Swarthmore College	Foundations of empirical knowledge		
Humanities	Philosophy	Glenn Raymond Morrow	University of Pennsylvania	Studies of Plato's laws and of Greek legislation and political tradition	Also won in 1956	
Humanities	Religion	Leonard J. Trinterud	McCormick Theological Seminary	Rise of Puritanism in England		
Humanities	Spanish and Portuguese Literature	Bruce W. Wardropper	Johns Hopkins University	Religious parodies of Spanish secular literature	Also won in 1959	
Humanities	United States History	Maynard Geiger		Biographical studies of Junípero Serra		
Humanities	United States History	Carl Parcher Russell	Yosemite National Park	History of the American West, especially the trade goods and equipment of fur traders and trappers	Also won in 1953	
Humanities	United States History	Francis Butler Simkins	Longwood College	Jefferson Davis		
Humanities	United States History	Kenneth Milton Stampp	University of California, Berkeley	"Negro slavery in the US, 1820-1860"	Also won in 1967	
Natural Sciences	Applied Mathematics	Ivan S. Sokolnikoff	University of California, Los Angeles	Two-dimensional boundary value problems in the field of the mathematical theory of elasticity	Also won in 1959	
Natural Sciences	Astronomy and Astrophysics	Samuel Herrick	University of California, Los Angeles	Rocket navigation	Also won in 1945	
Natural Sciences	Chemistry	William Andrew Bonner	Stanford University	Asymmetric synthesis of organic compounds		
Natural Sciences	Chemistry	George Edward Boyd	Oak Ridge National Laboratory	Studies of the statistical thermodynamics of macromolecules and of the physical chemistry of ion exchange polymers		
Natural Sciences	Chemistry	Herbert Philip Broida	National Bureau of Standards	Mechanism of gaseous combustion		
Natural Sciences	Chemistry	Alan Frank Clifford	Illinois Institute of Technology	Hydrogen fluoride solvent system	Also won in 1951	
Natural Sciences	Chemistry	Jerry Donohue	California Institute of Technology	Methods and results of the X-ray analysis of the structure of crystalline proteins and the nature of the hydrogen bond		
Natural Sciences	Chemistry	William Dulaney Gwinn	University of California, Berkeley	Molecular structure and molecular spectroscopy		
Natural Sciences	Chemistry	Ralph Stanley Halford	Columbia University	Vibrational spectra of molecular crystals		
Natural Sciences	Chemistry	Kenneth W. Hedberg	California Institute of Technology	Structures of gas molecules by the electron diffraction method		
Natural Sciences	Chemistry	Terrell Leslie Hill	Naval Medical Research Institute	Thermodynamic function of the liquid state		
Natural Sciences	Chemistry	Nathan Kornblum	Purdue University	Control of the course of substitution reactions involving bidentate anions		
Natural Sciences	Chemistry	Leonard Norman Liebermann	University of California, San Diego	Absorption of sounds in liquid		
Natural Sciences	Chemistry	John D. Roberts	Massachusetts Institute of Technology	The occurrence and the structures of non-classical cationic intermediates in organic reactions	Also won in 1954	
Natural Sciences	Chemistry	Charles Wiesner	University of New Brunswick	Structure of mold metabolites		
Natural Sciences	Earth Science	Daniel I. Axelrod	University of California, Los Angeles	Certain late tertiary floras of Western North America		
Natural Sciences	Earth Science	Perry Byerly	University of California, Berkeley	West Indian earthquakes	Also won in 1928	
Natural Sciences	Earth Science	Jeffery Earl Dawson	Cornell University	Chemical properties of peat soil		
Natural Sciences	Earth Science	Konrad Bates Krauskopf	Stanford University	Formation of ore deposits		
Natural Sciences	Engineering	Howard Wilson Emmons	Harvard University	Formation and rate of growth of turbulent bursts		
Natural Sciences	Geography and Environmental Studies	Dan Stanislawski	University of Texas	Structure of Portuguese society	Also won in 1967	
Natural Sciences	Mathematics	Chieh-Chien Chang	Johns Hopkins University	Application of mathematics to aeronautical problems		
Natural Sciences	Mathematics	Einar Hille	Yale University	Semi-groups		
Natural Sciences	Mathematics	Isidore Isaac Hirschman, Jr.	Washington University in St. Louis	Fourier analysis and synthesis		
Natural Sciences	Mathematics	John Myhill	Yale University	Theory of general recursive functions and its metamathematical applications		
Natural Sciences	Mathematics	Arthur Everett Pitcher	Lehigh University	Theory of critical levels and critical points of a function on a space and its subspaces		
Natural Sciences	Mathematics	Raphaël Salem	Massachusetts Institute of Technology	Problems in the field of trigonometric series and related fields		
Natural Sciences	Mathematics	Edwin Spanier	University of Chicago	Duality in homotopy theory		
Natural Sciences	Mathematics	André Weil	University of Chicago	Borderline problems between number theory and algebraic geometry	Also won in 1944	
Natural Sciences	Medicine and Health	Elvira Goettsch		Natural history of disease, particularly renal disorders		
Natural Sciences	Medicine and Health	Arnold Bernard Scheibel	University of Tennessee, Memphis	Fine structure of the pre- and post-synaptic elements of the human spinal cord	Also won in 1958	
Natural Sciences	Molecular and Cellular Biology	Halvor Niels Christensen	Tufts College	Biosynthesis of proteins		
Natural Sciences	Molecular and Cellular Biology	Corwin Herman Hansch	Pomona College	Mechanism of action of plant growth hormones by means of radioactive tracers	Also won in 1966	
Natural Sciences	Molecular and Cellular Biology	Niels Haugaard	University of Pennsylvania	Enzymatic breakdown of proteins		
Natural Sciences	Molecular and Cellular Biology	James Angus Jenkins	University of California, Berkeley	Genetics of cultivated tomato	Also won in 1944	
Natural Sciences	Molecular and Cellular Biology	James W. Moulder	University of Chicago	Bacterial metabolism of serine		
Natural Sciences	Molecular and Cellular Biology	Aaron Novick	University of Chicago	Genetics and physiology of micro-organisms		
Natural Sciences	Molecular and Cellular Biology	Bodil M. Schmidt-Nielsen	University of Cincinnati	Physiology of the camel and other desert mammals	With Knut Schmidt-Neilsen	
Natural Sciences	Molecular and Cellular Biology	Knut Schmidt-Nielsen	University of Cincinnati	Physiology of the camel and other desert mammals	With Bodil M. Schmidt-Nielsen	
Natural Sciences	Molecular and Cellular Biology	Harold Hill Smith	Cornell University			
Natural Sciences	Molecular and Cellular Biology	John Henry Welsh	Harvard University	Fundamental mechanism of action of acetylcholine		
Natural Sciences	Organismic Biology and Ecology	William Steel Creighton	City College of New York	Distribution of ants in the southwestern US	Also won in 1951	
Natural Sciences	Organismic Biology and Ecology	Demorest Davenport	University of California, Santa Barbara	Relations between parasites and their hosts	Also won in 1960	
Natural Sciences	Organismic Biology and Ecology	Herbert Girton Deignan	United States National Museum	Avifaunal distribution and variation of certain areas of Southeast Asia		
Natural Sciences	Organismic Biology and Ecology	Richard Marshall Eakin	University of California, Berkeley	Amphibian pituitary glands		
Natural Sciences	Organismic Biology and Ecology	Gordon Enoch Gates	Massachusetts Institute of Technology	Tropical earthworms	Also won in 1953	
Natural Sciences	Organismic Biology and Ecology	Carl L. Hubbs	Scripps Institution of Oceanography	Freshwater fish of Northeast Mexico		
Natural Sciences	Organismic Biology and Ecology	I. Michael Lerner	University of California, Berkeley	Genetics of populations under artificial selection	Also won in 1947 and 1956	
Natural Sciences	Organismic Biology and Ecology	Jane M. Oppenheimer	Bryn Mawr College	Embryological development of the brain of bony fish	Also won in 1942	
Natural Sciences	Organismic Biology and Ecology	Dixy Lee Ray	University of Washington	Biology of soil amebae		
Natural Sciences	Organismic Biology and Ecology	S. Dillon Ripley II	Yale University	Birds of the Moluccan Islands		
Natural Sciences	Organismic Biology and Ecology	Dorothea Rudnick	Albertus Magnus College	A study, using a chick embryo, of the enzyme systems assumed to initiate protein syntheses		
Natural Sciences	Organismic Biology and Ecology	Ernest Edward Williams	Harvard University	Structures of fossil and living land tortoises	Also won in 1981	
Natural Sciences	Physics	Theodore H. Berlin	Johns Hopkins University	Theory of the mechanism of condensation of gases based on a statistical model		
Natural Sciences	Physics	Richard Gildart Fowler	University of Oklahoma	Radiation processes in gas discharges		
Natural Sciences	Physics	Darragh E. Nagle	University of Chicago	Interactions between mesons and nucleons		
Natural Sciences	Physics	Hertha Dorothea Elisabeth Sponer	Duke University	Quantum mechanical methods for calculating structure properties of complex molecules		
Natural Sciences	Plant Science	Norman Hill Boke	University of Oklahoma	Histogenic study of shoot development in certain cacti		
Natural Sciences	Plant Science	Harold Johnston Brodie	Indiana University	Biology of the Nidulariaceae fungi		
Natural Sciences	Plant Science	Clair Alan Brown	Louisiana State University	Louisiana lignite compared with European lignite		
Natural Sciences	Plant Science	Marion Stilwell Cave	University of California, Berkeley	Evolutionary status of lower plant groups		
Natural Sciences	Plant Science	Herschel Lewis Roman	University of Washington	Genetics of yeast		
Natural Sciences	Plant Science	Rolf Singer	University of Tucumán (visiting)	Mycological flora of South America	Also won in 1942	
Natural Sciences	Plant Science	Truman George Yuncker	DePauw University	Plant life of the Tongan Islands		
Natural Sciences	Statistics	Harold A. Freeman	Massachusetts Institute of Technology	Statistical methods applied to industrial problems		
Natural Sciences	Statistics	Herbert Ellis Robbins	University of North Carolina	Probability theory and mathematical statistics	Also won in 1975	
Social Sciences	Anthropology and Cultural Studies	Joseph Benjamin Birdsell	University of California, Los Angeles	Processes of evolution in primitive human populations	Also won in 1946	
Social Sciences	Anthropology and Cultural Studies	David Crockett Graham	West China Union University (retired)	Ch'iang peoples of southwest China	Also won in 1955	
Social Sciences	Anthropology and Cultural Studies	Richard C. Rudolph	University of California, Los Angeles	History of Chinese archaeology	Also won in 1959	
Social Sciences	Economics	Raymond Adrien de Roover	Wells College	Medieval financial history	Also won in 1949	
Social Sciences	Economics	John Thomas Dunlop	Harvard University	Wages and prices under collective bargaining		
Social Sciences	Economics	George Alexander Elliott	University of Toronto	Theory of international trade		
Social Sciences	Economics	George Herbert Hildebrand	University of California, Los Angeles	Wages, employment, and unemployment in postwar Italy	Also won in 1957	
Social Sciences	Economics	William Orville Jones	Stanford University	Economics of production distribution and consumption of the manioc root		
Social Sciences	Law	Thomas Irwin Emerson	Yale University	Studies, mainly from a legal point of view, of the fundamental rights and obligations of the individual citizen in a modern democratic society		
Social Sciences	Political Science	Hannah Arendt	Jewish Cultural Reconstruction, Inc.	Totalitarian elements in Marxism		
Social Sciences	Psychology	Herbert G. Birch	City College of New York	Role of learning in the maternal behavior of the rat		
Social Sciences	Psychology	William C. H. Prentice	Swarthmore College	Interactions between perception and memory		
Social Sciences	Sociology	Henry M. Pachter	Deutsche Zeitung	Recent changes in the social status of the intelligentsia		
Social Sciences	Sociology	John Lawrence Thomas	St. Louis University	Cultural pluralism in the US		
Social Sciences	Sociology	Nathan Laselle Whetten	University of Connecticut	Rural life in Guatemala		

== 1952 Latin American and Caribbean Fellows ==
Category	Field of Study	Fellow	Institutional association	Research topic	Notes	Ref
Creative Arts	Fiction	Edgar Austin Mittelhölzer		Writing		
Creative Arts	Fine Arts	Antonio Frasconi			Also won in 1953	
Creative Arts	Fine Arts	José Vela Zanetti		Painted a mural for the United Nations	Also won in 1951	
Humanities	Architecture, Planning and Design	Erwin Walter Palm			Also won in 1953	
Humanities	Education	Carlos Cueto Fernandini				
Humanities	Iberian and Latin American History	John Horace Parry	University College of the West Indies	Municipal government in the Spanish Indies, from the Conquest to independence	Also won in 1956	
Natural Science	Mathematics	José Adem			Also won in 1951	
Natural Science	Mathematics	Mischa Cotlar		Ergodic theory	Also won in 1950	
Natural Science	Medicine and Health	Ephraim Donoso			Also won in 1951	
Natural Science	Medicine and Health	José A. Knaudt				
Natural Science	Molecular and Cellular Biology	Guillermo Arroyave	University of Rochester			
Natural Science	Molecular and Cellular Biology	Silvio Bruzzone			Also won in 1965	
Natural Science	Molecular and Cellular Biology	Ranwel Caputto	National University of Córdoba			
Natural Science	Molecular and Cellular Biology	Carlos Méndez Domínguez				
Natural Science	Organismic Biology and Ecology	Antenor Leitão de Carvalho		Research at Stanford University	Also won in 1947	
Natural Science	Organismic Biology and Ecology	José Cândido de Melo Carvalho			Also won in 1953	
Natural Science	Organismic Biology and Ecology	Ronald Gordon Fennah	Imperial College of Tropical Agriculture	Entomology of the Lesser Antilles		
Natural Science	Organismic Biology and Ecology	Zacarias de Jesús				
Natural Science	Organismic Biology and Ecology	Frederico Lane			Also won in 1957	
Natural Science	Organismic Biology and Ecology	Federico Medem			Also won in 1961	
Natural Science	Organismic Biology and Ecology	Francisco de Asis Monrós	University of Tucumán	Visiting principal museums in the US		
Natural Science	Plant Science	Jorge León		Studies at Washington University in St. Louis and the Missouri Botanical Gardens	Also won in 1951	
Natural Science	Plant Science	Alicia Lourteig			Also won in 1951	
Natural Science	Plant Science	José Antonio Molina Rosito		Taxonomy of vascular plants from Mexico, Central America, and the Antilles		
Natural Science	Plant Science	María Muntañola de Monró				
Natural Science	Plant Science	Edgard Sant'Anna Normanha				
Natural Science	Plant Science	Jorge Eduardo Wright				
Social Sciences	Anthropology and Cultural Studies	Luis Duque Gómez	Instituto Etnológico Nacional	Historic monuments and archaeological sites of Colombia		
Social Sciences	Anthropology and Cultural Studies	Roberto Pineda Giraldo				
Social Sciences	Anthropology and Cultural Studies	Virginia Gutiérrez de Pineda			Also won in 1964	
Social Sciences	Anthropology and Cultural Studies	Douglas MacRae Taylor		The Black Carib language of British Honduras		

== See also ==
- Guggenheim Fellowship
- List of Guggenheim Fellowships awarded in 1951
- List of Guggenheim Fellowships awarded in 1953
