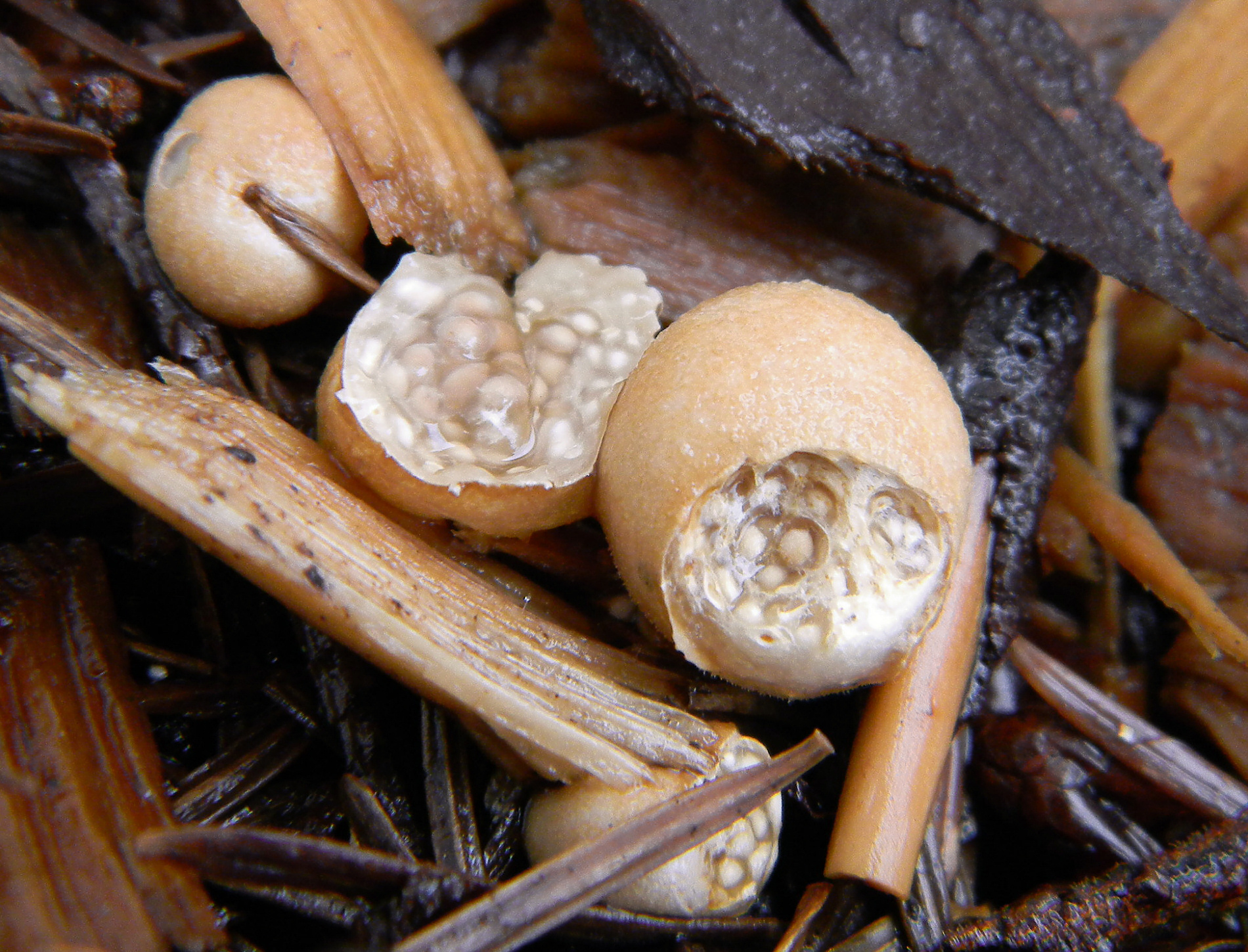
- Nidularia deformis

Scientific classification
- Kingdom: Fungi
- Division: Basidiomycota
- Class: Agaricomycetes
- Order: Agaricales
- Family: Agaricaceae
- Genus: Nidularia; Fr. & Nordholm (1817)

Type species
- Nidularia farcta (Roth) Fr. (1823)

Synonyms
- Granularia Roth (1791)

= Nidularia =

Genus of fungi

Nidularia is a genus of nine species of fungi in the family Agaricaceae. Their fruit bodies resemble tiny egg-filled bird nests. The name comes from the Latin nidus meaning nest. The related genus Mycocalia was segregated from Nidularia in 1961 based on differences in the microscopic structure of the peridium.

== Taxonomy ==
The name Nidularia first appeared in the scientific literature in 1790 when Pierre Bulliard published N. vernicosa and N. laevis. This name, however, was not validly published, as it predated the starting point for naming of gasteroid fungi (1801), and it lacked a generic description. Jean Bulliard gave a generic description in 1791 when he added N. striata. N. striata and N. vernicosa are now placed in Cyathus, while N. laevis is in Crucibulum. Bulliard's concept of Nidularia is synonymous with Cyathus.

Nidularia was again circumscribed in 1817 by Swedish mycologist Elias Magnus Fries and his student Johann Nordholm. N. radicata, N. confluens, N. deformis, and N. denudata. Nidularia farcta was given as the type species; today both this taxon as well as N. radicata are thought to be synonymous with Nidularia deformis. N. denudata is now the type species of a related genus, Mycocalia. Granularia, a genus erected by Albrecht Wilhelm Roth in 1791 to contain Granularia pisiformis (now Nidularia deformis), is synonymous with Nidularia.

In 1961, J.T. Palmer separated Nidularia section Sorosia as a distinct genus, Mycocalia, combining Nidularia denudata, N. castanea, N. fusispora, and N. reticulata, and adding the new species Mycocalia minutissima. In these species, the peridium comprises hyaline, branched, septate hyphae with clamp connections. In contrast, the peridium of Nidularia have tinted, rigid, spiny, aseptate hyphae that continue into long threads. The peridium of Mycocalia species is thin, white and short-lasting, while in Nidularia it is somewhat darker in color and more robust.

Formerly classified in the family Nidulariaceae, along with other bird's nest fungi genera (Cyathus, Crucibulum, Nidula, and Mycocalia), molecular phylogenetic analysis has shown that these fungi belong in the family Agaricaceae.

=== Species ===
As of January 2016, Index Fungorum accepts nine species in the genus Nidularia:

- Nidularia bonaerensis Speg. 1880
- Nidularia campoi Speg. 1921 – South America
- Nidularia castanea (Ellis & Everh. ex V.S.White) Sacc. & D.Sacc. 1905
- Nidularia deformis (Willd.) Fr. 1817
- Nidularia griseolazulina Lindsey & Gilb. 1975 – United States
- Nidularia heribaudii Har. & Pat. 1904
- Nidularia heterospora Sosin 1960
- Nidularia microspora Velen. 1939
- Nidularia pulvinata (Schwein.) Fr. 1823

== Description ==
Fruit bodies of species in this genus grow together in large groups, and have dimensions that are typically 0.5–6 mm in diameter by 0.5–3 mm tall. They may be somewhat irregular in shape, or have a well-formed cup that is thin and fragile. The peridium has a tomentose surface composed of irregular, spiny hyphae over a more compact wall that later breaks down to expose may brown peridioles within. Unlike other bird's-nest genera formerly classified in the family Nidulariaceae, the peridioles of the Nidularia are not connected to the fruit body by a funicular cord, but rather lay clumped together in a gelatinous matrix. There may be over 100 peridioles embedded in the matrix. In Nidularia pulvinata, they have an average size of 1.1 mm diameter by 0.5 mm thickness, with an average mass of 0.2 grams. This species has an estimated 7 million spores per peridiole.

Spores are roughly elliptical in shape, hyaline, and usually with dimensions of 5–10.5 by 4–5.5 μm. Nidularia griseolazulina, however, has larger spores than typical, measuring 14–18 by 10–14 μm.

== Habitat and distribution ==
Nidularia species are saprophytic, and grow on rotting wood. The thin, fragile peridium is ruptured by falling raindrops, after which the impact of additional raindrops spreads the internal matrix and dislodges the peridioles within. The splash mechanism of Nidularia pulvinata discharges peridioles horizontally at speeds ranging from 0.3 to 3.0 meters per second, with ejection distances averaging 8 mm (0.3 in).

== See also ==
- List of Agaricales genera
- List of Agaricaceae genera
