= Nidula shingbaensis =

Scientific classification
- Kingdom: Fungi
- Division: Basidiomycota
- Class: Agaricomycetes
- Order: Agaricales
- Family: Agaricaceae
- Genus: Nidula
- Species: N. shingbaensis

Binomial name
- Nidula shingbaensis K.Das & R.L.Zhao (2013)

Species of fungus

Nidula shingbaensis is a rare species of bird's nest fungus in the family Agaricaceae. Found in the north district of Sikkim (India), where it grows on small fallen twigs of Bhutan fir (Abies densa), it was described as new to science in 2013. It has a peridium measuring 6–9 mm tall with a mouth diameter of 5–7 mm. The peridium contains up to 40 small "eggs" (peridioles) measuring 0.9–1.3 mm in diameter. The peridioles are filled with broadly ellipsoid to elongated spores that are 6.9–8.3–9.8 by 4.9–5.4–6.1 μm. Measuring 650–720 μm thick, the peridium comprises six distinct tissue layers—a feature that is unique in the genus Nidula.
