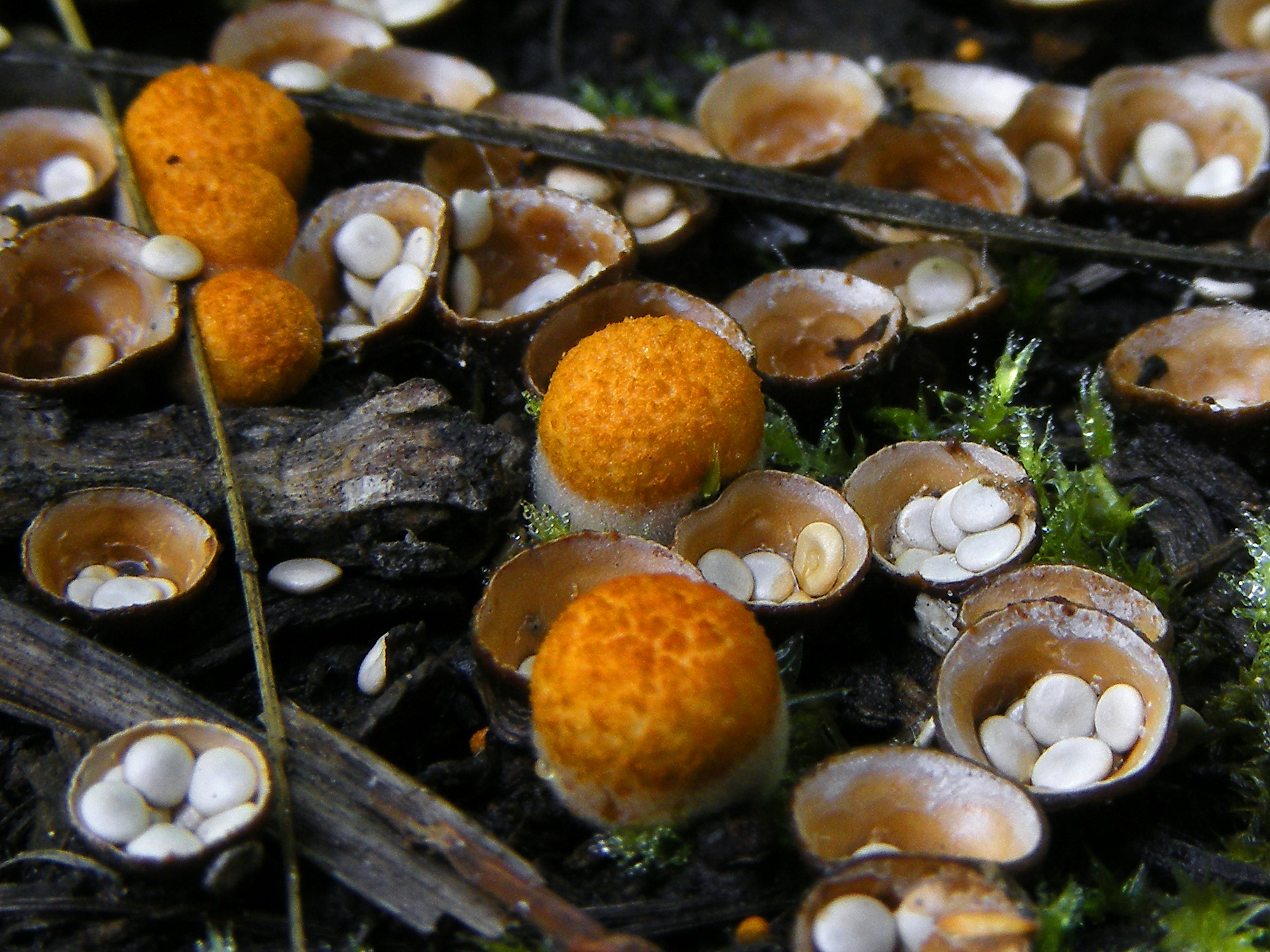
- Crucibulum laeve

Scientific classification
- Kingdom: Fungi
- Division: Basidiomycota
- Class: Agaricomycetes
- Order: Agaricales
- Family: Nidulariaceae
- Genus: Crucibulum; Tul. & C.Tul. (1844)

Type species
- Crucibulum laeve (Huds.) Kambly (1936)

Species
- Crucibulum cyathiforme Crucibulum laeve Crucibulum parvulum

= Crucibulum (fungus) =

Genus of fungi

Crucibulum
- Mycological characteristics
- Glebal hymenium
- Cap is infundibuliform
- Hymenium attachment is not applicable
- Lacks a stipe
- Ecology is saprotrophic
- Edibility is inedible

Crucibulum is a genus in the Nidulariaceae, a family of fungi whose fruiting bodies resemble tiny egg-filled bird's nests. Often called "splash cups", the fruiting bodies are adapted for spore dispersal by using the kinetic energy of falling drops of rain. The "eggs" inside the bird's nests (technically known as peridioles) are hard waxy shells containing spores, and tend to stick to whatever nearby herbage they land on, thus increasing the odds of being consumed and dispersed by herbivorous animals.

Members of this genus are saprobic, obtaining nutrients from dead organic matter, and are typically found growing on decayed wood and wood debris. The three known Crucibulum species (C. laeve, C. parvulum, and C. cyathiforme) are distinguished from other genera of the Nidulariaceae by their relatively simple funiculus – a cord of hyphae that connects the peridiole (the "eggs") to the exterior of the bird's nest.

== Taxonomy ==
Bird's nest fungi were first mentioned by Flemish botanist Carolus Clusius in Rariorum plantarum historia (1601). Over the next couple of centuries, these fungi were the subject of some controversy regarding whether the peridioles were seeds, and the mechanism by which they were dispersed in nature. For example, the French botanist Jean-Jacques Paulet, in his work Traité des champignons (1790–3), erroneously suggested that peridioles were ejected from the fruiting bodies by some sort of spring mechanism.

The structure and biology of the genus Crucibulum was better known by the mid-19th century, when the brothers Louis René and Charles Tulasne published a monograph on the bird's nest fungi. Subsequently, monographs were written in 1902 by Violet S. White (American species), Curtis Gates Lloyd in 1906, Gordon Herriot Cunningham in 1924 (New Zealand species), and Harold J. Brodie in 1975.

The type species for the genus Crucibulum described by the Tulasne brothers was Crucibulum vulgare, an older synonym of the species known today as C. laeve. However, this naming choice was later deemed invalid by rules of fungal nomenclature; the first name validly applied to the species was C. laeve, use by De Candolle, who had based his species upon Nidularia laevis as it appeared in Bulliard's Histoire des Champignons de la France (Paris, 1791). Kambly and Lee published the first taxonomically valid description of the genus in 1936. In their 1844 monograph on the Nidulariaceae, the brothers Louis René and Charles Tulasne used the name Crucibulum vulgare, and the species was known by this name until the International Commission on the Taxonomy of Fungi (ICTF) changed the starting-point date for the naming of fungi, and C. vulgare was deemed invalid. The etymology of the specific epithet is derived from the Latin laeve, meaning "smooth".

=== Species ===
Until the 1970s Crucibulum was thought to be monotypic, containing the single species C. laeve (formerly C. vulgaris). This was in part due to the stance that Curtis Gates Lloyd and other mycologists had taken in the early 20th century, believing that the designation of new species was not justifiable due to the existence of intermediate forms in similar habitats and close proximity. In 1970–71, Brodie discovered and reported two variants that differed from C. laeve sufficiently to justify naming them as new species.

==== Crucibulum cyathiforme ====
The specific epithet of this species refers to the vase-like or Cyathus-like (obconic) form of the peridia. It differs from Crucibulum laeve in the shape and pink-color of its peridia, as well as its slightly or strongly curved spores (typically 6.5–8 x 11–17 μm). It was found growing on rotten wood and soil in Colombia by mycologist Gastón Guzmán.

==== Crucibulum laeve ====
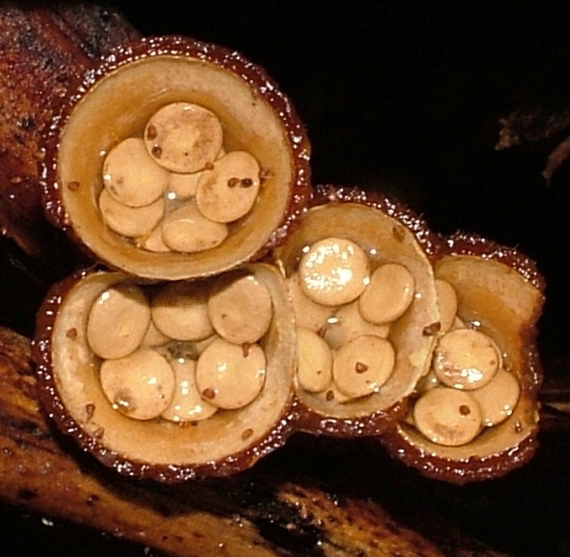
Close-up of the peridioles of C. laeve

Crucibulum laeve or the white-egg bird's nest have peridia that are 3–7 mm in diameter x 3–8 mm tall, cup-shaped, short and cylindrical with roughly parallel side walls. The tomentose exterior surface is tan to yellow when young and whiter in age. Young specimens have a coarsely tomentose epiphragm (membranous cover) that soon disappears. The peridioles are 1–2 mm broad, tan to white in color, disc-shaped, and wrinkled when dry. This species grows on material like twigs, lignin-rich vegetable debris, wood chips, old matting, or manure.

The immature fruiting body of Crucibulum laeve (technically, the peridium), is roughly spherical in shape, but in maturity the base is narrowed slightly relative to the top, so that it appears like a cup, or crucible. The fruiting bodies are usually 5–8 mm tall and almost as wide at the mouth. When young, the mouth is enclosed by a thin membrane called an epiphragm, which is covered with surface hairs. As the fruiting body matures and the fruiting body expands, the epiphragm ruptures, exposing the internal contents. The wall of the fruiting body is made of a single uniform layer of closely interwoven hyphae (the threadlike filaments that form the mycelium) roughly 0.25–0.5 mm thick; this wall structure is in contrast to species from the bird's nest fungus genus Cyathus, which have a distinctly three-layered wall. Young species have a yellowish velvety cover of fine hairs, but this external surface becomes sloughed off and becomes smooth as the fruiting body matures; the color changes to brown, although some old weathered specimens may be bleached grey or dirty white. The inner surface of the fruiting body is smooth and shiny. The cups contain tiny pale ochraceous or white "eggs," technically termed peridioles, usually 1–2 mm in diameter. In each peridiole is a spore-producing layer of tissue, the hymenium. This layer is largely composed of basidia (spore-producing cells) mixed with paraphyses (non-spore producing elements interspersed between basidia). Peridioles are covered by a thin membrane of loosely woven hyphae known as a tunica; separated from the light-colored tunica, the peridioles are black. The peridioles are attached to the inner wall of the peridium by a thin, elastic cord of mycelium, a funiculus, which can be extended at length when moist.

Crucibulum laeve has spores that are elliptical, hyaline (translucent), and smooth, with dimensions of 7–10 by 4–6 μm.

==== Crucibulum parvulum ====
This species, which is also known as the scanty bird's nest, is characterized by its very small peridia (dimensions 1.5–3 mm wide at the mouth x 2–4 mm tall) with a color that may range from white to grey to pale buff, but never yellow – helping distinguish it from C. laeve. The peridia are obconic, thin-walled (150–180 μm at the lip, approximately 300 μm thick at the edge of the lip), tomentose on the outer side and smooth on the inner side, and taper to a narrow base. The peridioles range in width between 0.5 and 1.25 mm broad. Basidiospores have dimensions of 4–5 by 7–8 μm.

== Description ==
Crucibulum species have light tan to cinnamon-colored fruiting bodies, known as a peridium, that are cup- or crucible-shaped. Depending on the species, the size of the peridium may range from 2–4 mm tall by 1.5–3 mm wide at the mouth (for C. parvulum) to 5–10 mm tall by 5–8 mm wide (for C. laeve). Viewed microscopically, the wall of the peridium is made of a single layer of tissue, in contrast to the three-layered peridium wall in Cyathus species. The outer surface of the peridium has hyphae that agglutinate so as to form a texture with visible filaments, a condition known as fibrillose; this outer layers of hairs typically wears off with age to leave a relatively smooth surface.

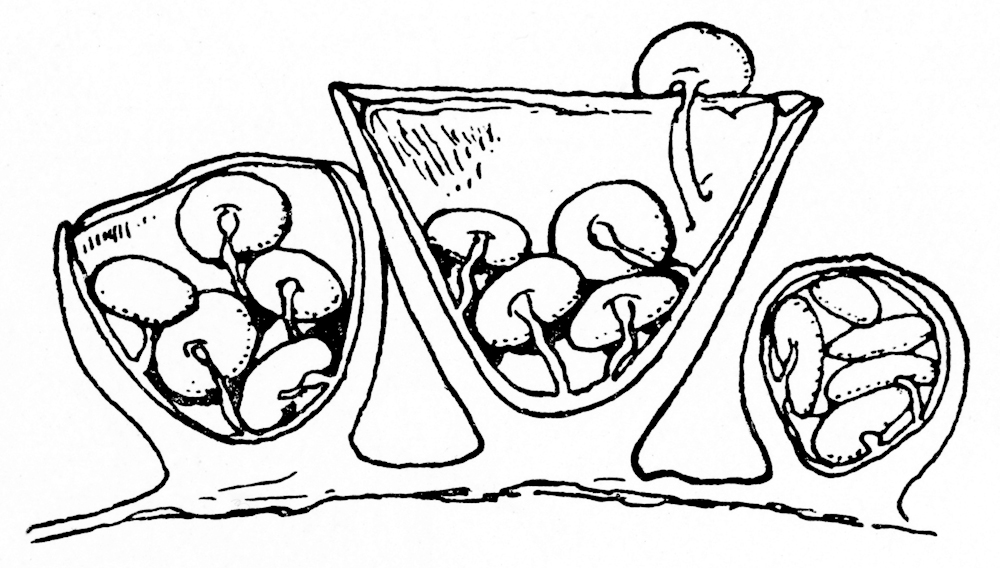
Cross section of C. laeve fruiting bodies in various stages of development

Young specimens have a thin layer of tissue called an epiphragm that covers the top of the peridium; it wears off at maturity to expose the peridioles within. There are usually four to six peridioles (up to 15 have been noted for C. laeve) that are disc-shaped, whitish in color, and attached to the endoperidium by a strand called a funicular cord. Made of mycelia, the funicular cord tends to wither away and disappear as the fruiting body ages. Spores from Crucibulum species typically have an elliptical or roughly spherical shape, and are thick-walled, translucent (hyaline) or light yellow-brown in color, with dimensions of 5–15 μm by 5–8 μm. The spores of C. cyathiforme are notably slightly or strongly curved.

Because the basic fruiting body structure in all genera of the family Nidulariaceae is essentially similar, Crucibulum may be readily confused with species of Nidula or Cyathus, especially older, weathered specimens of Cyathus that may have the hairy ectoperidium worn off. It distinguished from Nidula by the presence of a funiculus, a cord of hyphae attaching the peridiole to the endoperidium. Cyathus differs from genus Crucibulum by having a distinct three-layered wall and a more intricate funiculus.

=== Peridiole structure ===
Derived from the Greek word peridion, meaning "small leather pouch", the peridiole is the "egg" of the bird's nest. It is a mass of basidiospores and glebal tissue enclosed by a hard and waxy outer shell. In Crucibulum, the disc-shaped peridioles are light buff or white; the white colouring is due to a persistent layer of tissue surrounding the peridioles, called a tunica. Inside the peridiole is a spore-bearing tissue (the hymenium) that is made of spore-bearing cells (basidia), sterile (non-reproductive) structures, and spores.

Peridioles are attached to the fruiting body by a funiculus, a structure of hyphae that may be differentiated into three regions: the basal piece, which attaches it to the inner wall of the peridium, the middle piece, and an upper sheath, called the purse, connected to the lower surface of the peridiole. In the purse and middle piece is a coiled thread of interwoven hyphae called the funicular cord, attached at one end to the peridiole and at the other end to an entangled mass of hyphae called the hapteron. In Crucibulum species the peridioles are covered by a whitish tunica. The funiculus of Crucibulum species is markedly different from those of Cyathus species: in Crucibulum, the purse is a rounded knob 0.3–0.5 mm wide, attached to the underside of the peridiole. Attaching the purse directly to the wall of the peridium is a stout yellow-grey cord 0.1 mm wide and about 2.5 mm long.

=== Development ===
The initial studies on the development of the fruiting bodies in Crucibulum were performed by the brothers Tulasne (1844), Sachs (1855), DeBary (1866), Eidam (1877), and Walker (1920). Collectively, these early researchers determined that basidiospores are produced on club-shaped basidia which line the internal cavity of the peridiole. Basidia typically have 4 spores, attached by a short projection (a sterigma); after being detached from the basidia the spores migrate towards the center of the peridiole concurrently with the collapse and gelatinization of the underlying tissues.

=== Life cycle ===
The life cycle of Crucibulum, which contains both haploid and diploid stages, is typical of the species of Basidiomycota that can reproduce both asexually (via vegetative spores), or sexually (with meiosis). Like other wood-decay fungi, this life cycle may be considered as two functionally different phases: the vegetative stage for the spread of mycelia, and the reproductive stage for the establishment of spore-producing structures, the fruiting bodies.

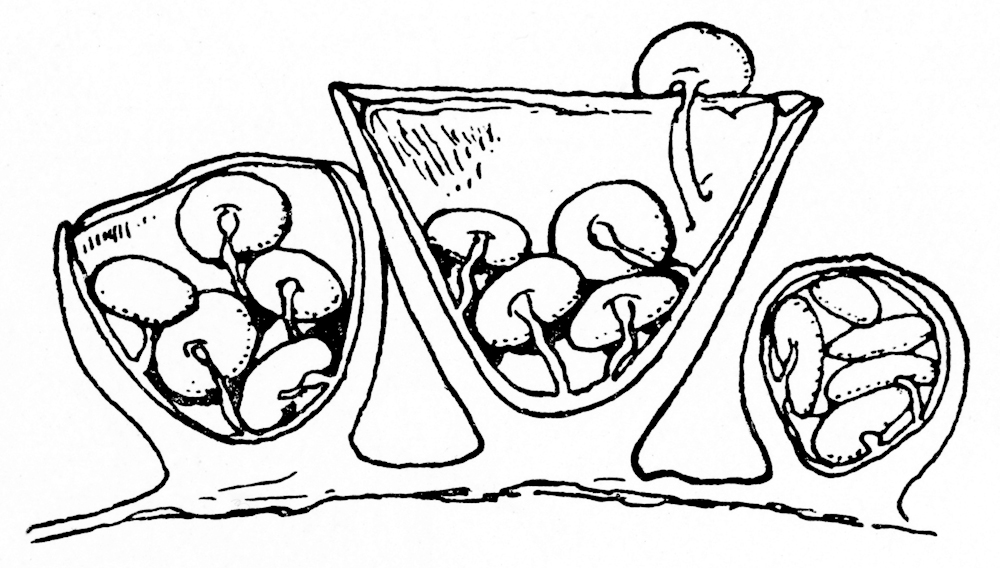
Cross section of C. laeve fruiting bodies in various stages of development

The vegetative stage encompasses those phases of the life cycle involved with the germination, spread, and survival of the mycelium. Spores germinate under suitable conditions of moisture and temperature, and grow into branching filaments called hyphae, pushing out like roots into the rotting wood. These hyphae are homokaryotic, containing a single nucleus in each compartment; they increase in length by adding cell-wall material to a growing tip. As these tips expand and spread to produce new growing points, a network called the mycelium develops. Mycelial growth occurs by mitosis and the synthesis of hyphal biomass. When two homokaryotic hyphae of different mating compatibility groups fuse with one another, they form a dikaryotic mycelia in a process called plasmogamy. Prerequisites for mycelial survival and colonization a substrate (like rotting wood) include suitable humidity and nutrient availability. Crucibulum laeve is saprobic, so mycelial growth in rotting wood is made possible by the secretion of enzymes that break down complex polysaccharides (such as cellulose and lignin) into simple sugars that can be used as nutrients.

After a period of time and under the appropriate environmental conditions, the dikaryotic mycelia may enter the reproductive stage of the life cycle. Fruiting body formation is influenced by external factors such as season (which affects temperature and air humidity), nutrients and light. As fruiting bodies develop they produce peridioles containing the basidia upon which new basidiospores are made. Young basidia contain a pair of haploid sexually compatible nuclei which fuse, and the resulting diploid fusion nucleus undergoes meiosis to produce basidiospores, each containing a single haploid nucleus. The dikaryotic mycelia from which the fruiting bodies are produced is long lasting and will continue to produce successive generations of fruiting bodies as long as the environmental conditions are favorable.

=== Spore dispersal ===
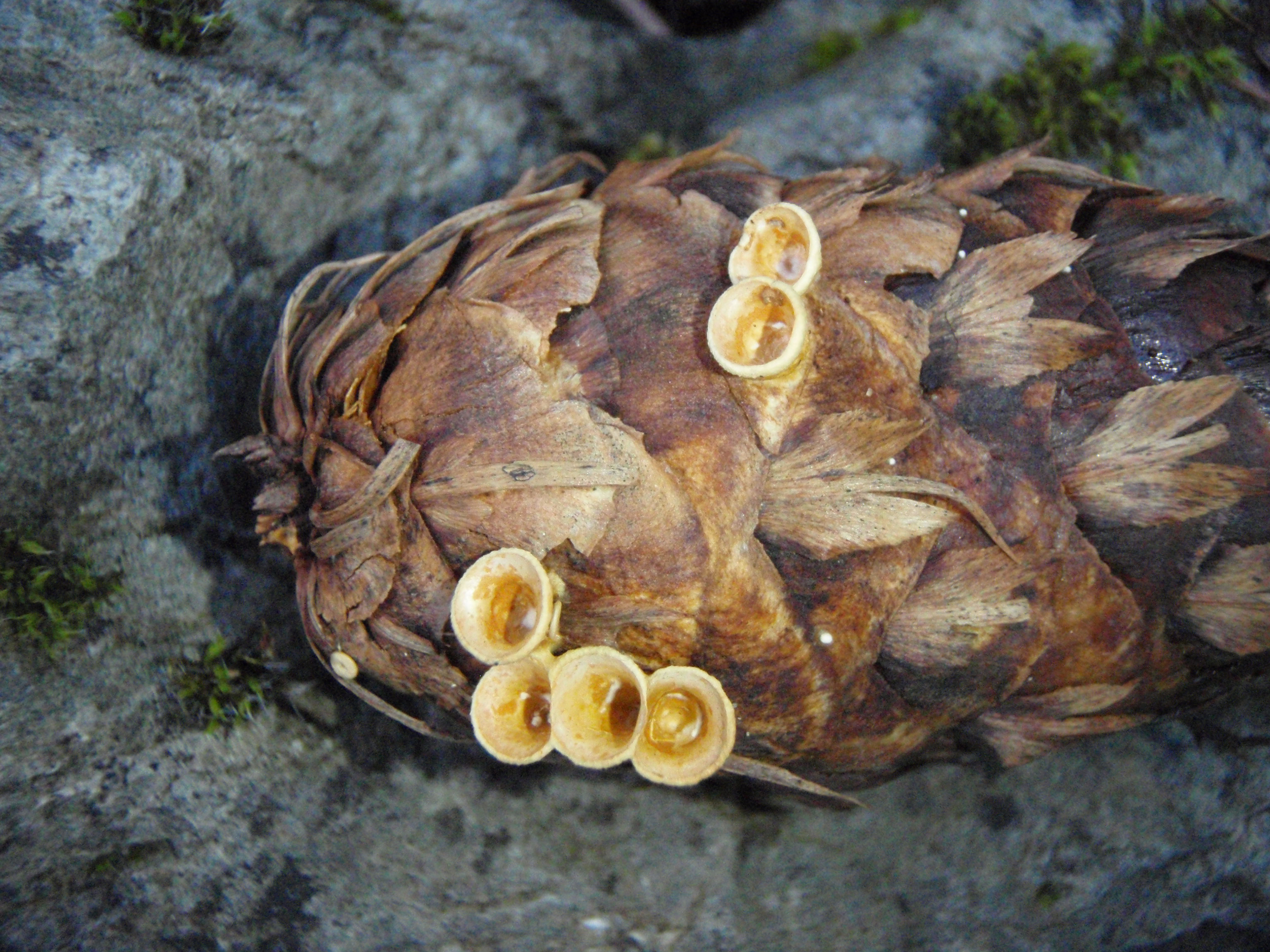
C. laeve growing on a Douglas-fir cone

Spores are dispersed when a peridiole is dislodged by raindrops or water dripping off an over-hanging leaf. The smooth inner walls of the fruiting body consistently form an angle of 70–75° with the horizontal; it has been demonstrated experimentally that the combined effect of the crucible shape and internal wall angle produce a good splash action. The force of the falling water splashes out the peridiole, uncoiling and snapping the funiculus, the cord that connects it to the fruiting body. As the peridiole continues its flight, the funiculus extends to its full length. The sticky end of the funiculus may adhere to a leaf or a twig some distance away, and the peridiole may end up being wrapped around or hanging down the object to which the funiculus is stuck. The spores can germinate when the thick outer wall of the peridiole wears away, or the peridiole may be eaten by a herbivorous animal, and ultimately passed through its digestive system. This method of spore dispersal, first suggested by John Ray in the late 17th century, was tested experimentally by Martin (1927), and more thoroughly by Buller and Brodie in the 1940s.

== Habitat and distribution ==
Like other bird's nest fungi, Crucibulum species are saprobic and derive their nutrients from decomposing organic matter. They are typically found growing on wood and woody debris such as stems, twigs, wood chips, old nut shells, and old matting; they are sometimes found on "dried manure cakes". Brodie notes (of C. laeve) they are "never" found on soil or large logs. C. parvulum has been found on the roots and stems of old or dead dry land plants such as Juniperus horizontalis and Artemisia species.

Crucibulum laeve, the most well-known species of Crucibulum, is a temperate-zone species with a circumpolar distribution. It has been collected in most European countries and the Canary Islands; in North America it has been found from Alaska to Mexico, while South American locations include Chile and Tierra del Fuego. It has also been found in Australia, Iceland, Japan, and New Zealand. C. parvulum has a primarily North American distribution, having been found in Alaska, southern Alberta badlands, the Canadian Rocky Mountains and in semi-deserts of Idaho; in 2004 it was collected in China. C. cyathiforme is only known from Colombia—where it was discovered growing at an elevation of nearly 7,000 feet (2,100 m)—and Armenia.

== Edibility ==
Species in the family Nidulariaceae, including Crucibulum, are considered inedible, as they are "not sufficiently large, fleshy, or odorous to be of interest to humans as food". However, there have not been reports of poisonous alkaloids or other substances considered toxic to humans.

== Bioactive compounds ==
Skeletal formula of salfredin B_{11}. A total synthesis of the compound was achieved in 1998.

Grown in liquid culture, Crucibulum laeve produces bioactive chemicals called salfredins that are structurally related to benzofuran and chromene, molecules that contain cyclic amide or lactone five-membered ring structures; these compounds are unique to this species. Salfredin B_{11} was first identified in 1995, while later research confirmed the presence of additional salfredin-type metabolites. These compounds are inhibitors of aldose reductase, an enzyme that has been implicated in the formation of cataracts in advanced stages of diabetes mellitus. The salfredin compounds may have therapeutic use in the treatment of this disorder.
