= Dorothea Rudnick =

American embryologist

Dorothea Rudnick (January 17, 1907 – January 10, 1990) was an American embryologist, who also made contributions as a scientific editor and translator.

== Early life and education ==
Dorothea Rudnick was born in Oconomowoc, Wisconsin in 1907, and was raised in Chicago, Illinois. Her father Paul Rudnick was chief chemist for Armour Laboratories, and both of her brothers became physicists. As a student at Parker High School she won the $2500 grand prize in an essay contest sponsored by the Chicago Daily Tribune.

She earned her PhD at the University of Chicago in 1931 under zoologist Benjamin Harrison Willier. Her dissertation was titled "Thyroid Forming Potencies of the Early Chick Blastoderm."

== Career ==
Dr. Rudnick spent most of her academic career at Albertus Magnus College, as a professor in the biology department from 1940 until she retired in 1977, and as an emeritus professor after retirement. She also had ongoing research affiliation with the nearby Osborn Memorial Laboratories at Yale University. Among her research collaborators was biologist Viktor Hamburger. Rudnick's publications were especially noted for the cell diagrams she hand-drew to explain embryogenesis and other processes.

She served as secretary and publications editor of the Connecticut Academy of Arts and Sciences, and as longtime editor of symposia published by the Society for Developmental Biology. Her translation work included a 1967 biography of biologist Theodor Boveri, written in German by Fritz Baltzer.

Dorothea Rudnick received a Guggenheim Fellowship in 1952.

== Personal life ==
Rudnick lived a somewhat reclusive personal life in a modern house on a hillside in Hamden, Connecticut designed in 1956 by architect King-lui Wu. She died at Los Alamos, New Mexico early in 1990, just before her 93rd birthday.
