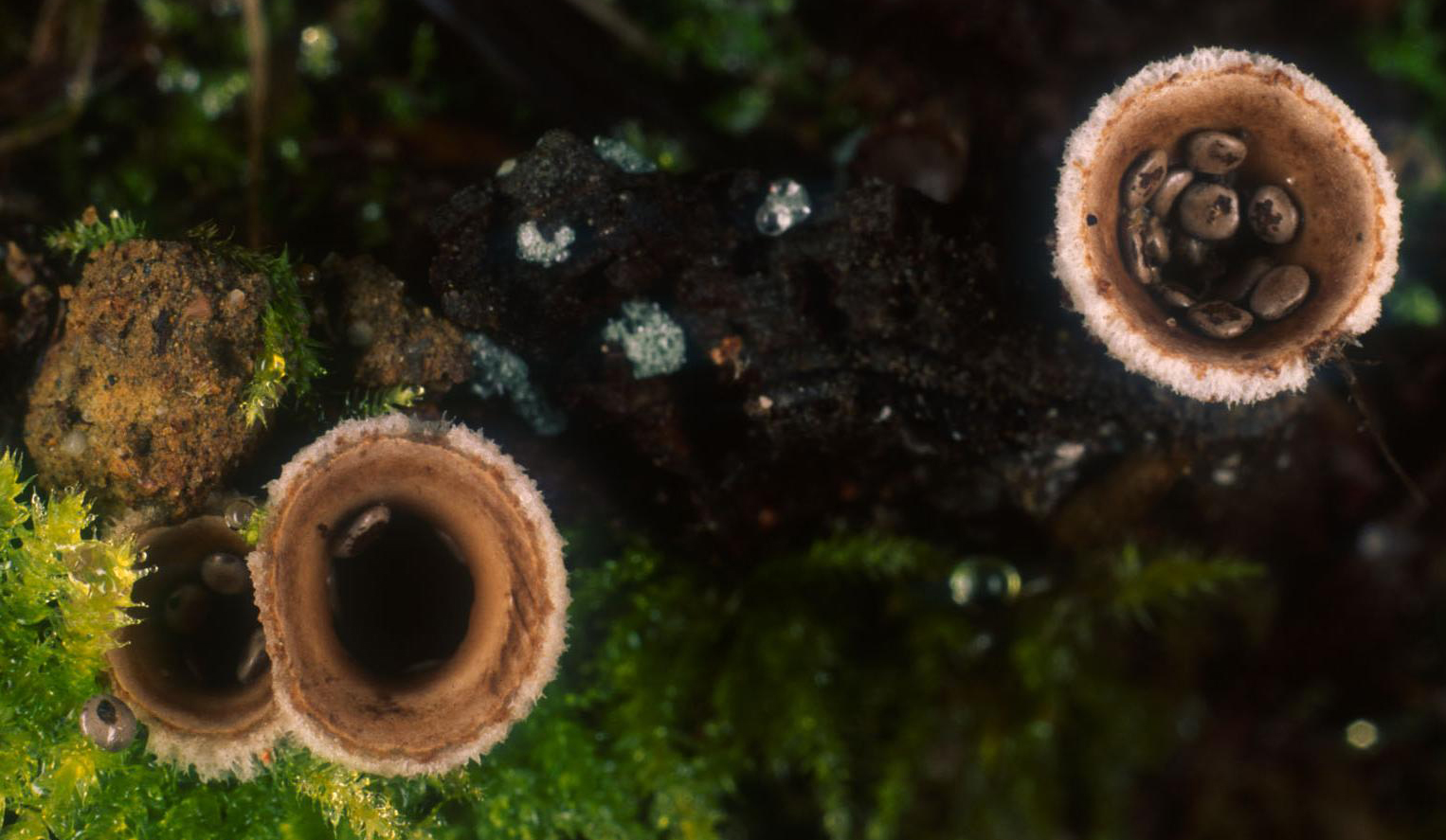
- Nidula candida

Scientific classification
- Kingdom: Fungi
- Division: Basidiomycota
- Class: Agaricomycetes
- Order: Agaricales
- Family: Agaricaceae
- Genus: Nidula; V.S.White (1902)

Type species
- Nidula candida (Peck) V.S.White (1902)

Species
- †N. baltica N. candida N. emodensis N. macrocarpa N. niveotomentosa N. shingbaensis

= Nidula =

Genus of fungi

Nidula is a genus of fungi in the family Agaricaceae. Their fruit bodies resemble tiny egg-filled birds' nests, from which they derive their common name "bird's nest fungi". Originally described in 1902, the genus differs from the related genera Cyathus and Crucibulum by the absence of a cord that attaches the eggs to the inside of the fruit body. The life cycle of this genus allows it to reproduce both sexually, with meiosis, and asexually via spores.

Species in this genus produce a number of bioactive compounds, including 4-(p-hydroxyphenyl)-2-butanone, a major component of raspberry flavor and insect attractor used in pesticides.

== Taxonomy ==
The genus Nidula was originally proposed by Violet S. White in her monograph on the North American species of the Nidulariaceae, and included the species N. candida and N. microcarpa. The genus name is derived from the Latin nidula, meaning "little nest". Although originally classified in the family Nidulariaceae, molecular phylogenetics demonstrated that the Nidulariaceae are part of the agaricoid clade, and Nidula was later transferred to the family Agaricaceae.

== Description ==
The fruit bodies (peridia) of Nidula species are typically 3–8 mm in diameter, 5–15 mm tall, and cup- or urn-shaped—having almost vertical sides with the lip flared outwards. Depending on the species, the color may range from white, grey, buff, or tawny. The peridia are covered on the external surface with closely matted, shaggy hairs, technically called a tomentum. Immature peridia have a membrane covering the mouth (an epiphragm), which later ruptures into 4–7 lobes when mature. The "eggs", or peridioles, are numerous, grey-brown or reddish-brown in color, and embedded in a gelatinous matrix when young and fresh. In contrast to other genera of the Nidulariaceae, such as Cyathus or Crucibulum, the peridioles of the Nidula are not attached to the peridia by a cord of mycelia known as a funiculus. The spores are ovoid to elliptical in shape, thick-walled, light brown, and have dimensions of 8–10 by 4–6 μm.

=== Life cycle ===
The life cycle of the genus Nidula, which contains both haploid and diploid stages, is typical of taxa in the basidiomycetes that can reproduce both asexually (via vegetative spores), or sexually (with meiosis). Basidiospores produced in the peridioles each contain a single haploid nucleus. After dispersal, the spores germinate and grow into homokaryotic hyphae, with a single nucleus in each compartment. When two homokaryotic hyphae of different mating compatibility groups fuse with one another, they form a dikaryotic mycelia in a process called plasmogamy. Like other members of the Nidulariaceae, species in Nidula have a heterothallic (bifactorial) mating system. After a period of time and under the appropriate environmental conditions, fruit bodies may be formed from the dikaryotic mycelia. These fruit bodies produce peridioles containing the basidia upon which new basidiospores are made. Young basidia contain a pair of haploid sexually compatible nuclei which fuse, and the resulting diploid fusion nucleus undergoes meiosis to produce haploid basidiospores.

== Species ==
There are five extant and one extinct species of Nidula:

- N. baltica

Described in 2014 from a fossil found in Baltic amber.

- N. candida

Peridia are 10 to 15 mm tall, grey to dark buff, with a recurved rim at maturity. The peridioles are 1.5–2 mm wide, and light grey-brown, and smooth. The spores are elliptical, with dimensions of 4–6 by 8–10 μm.

- N. macrocarpa

Peridia are 5 to 10 mm tall, and white to yellowish in color; the rim is either straight or slightly recurved. Peridioles are 0.5 to 1 mm wide, wrinkled, and colored red-brown. Spores are elliptical or roughly spherical, with dimensions of 6–9 by 5–6 μm.

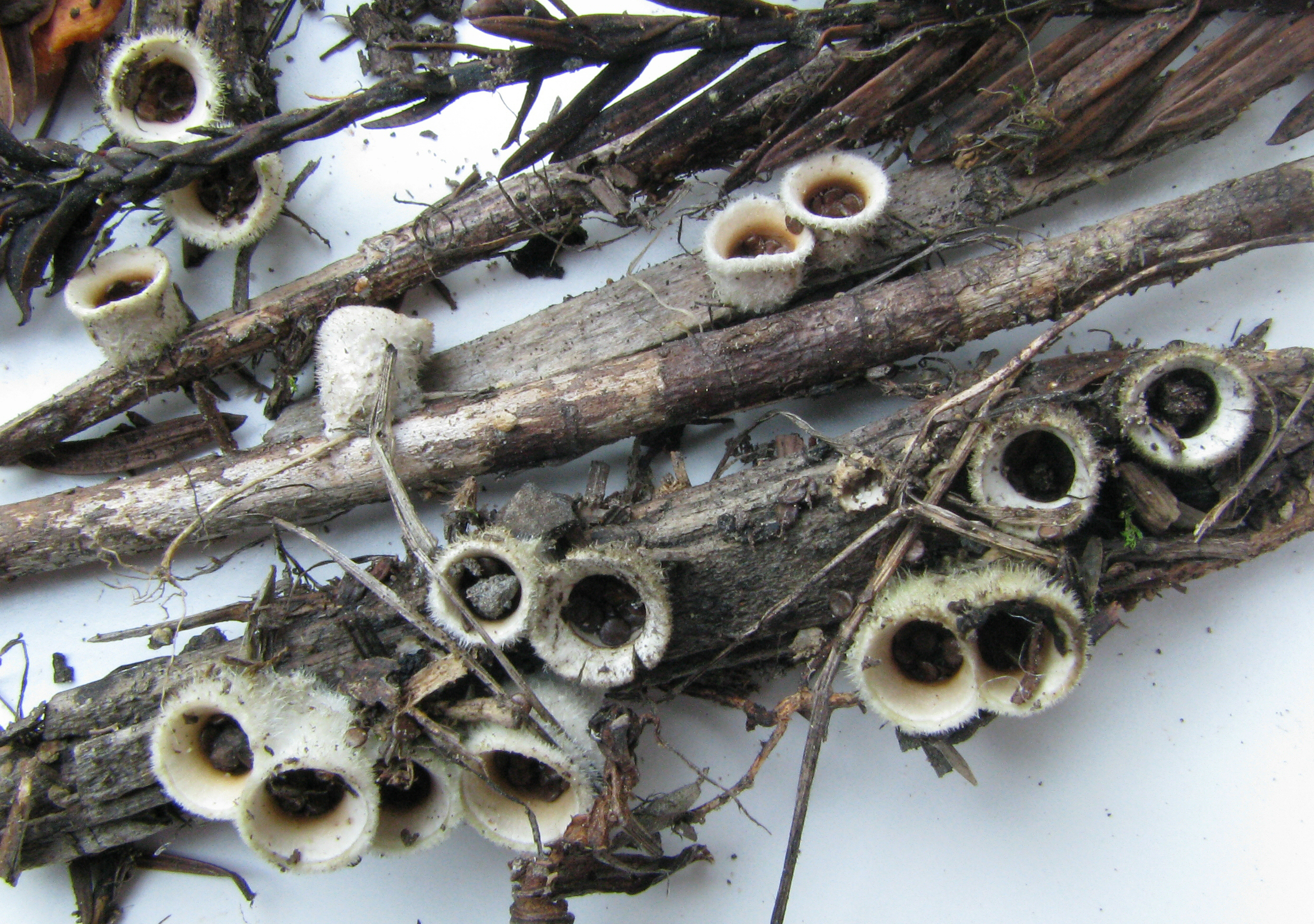
N. niveo-tomentosa

- N. niveo-tomentosa

Peridia are 4–6 mm tall with rims that have a fringe of white hairs. Peridioles are mahogany-brown and 0.5–1 mm wide. Spores have an elliptical or roughly spherical shape, and are 6–9 by 5–6 μm.

- N. emodensis

Peridia are 4–6 mm tall by 4–5 mm wide at the mouth. The exterior surface is a grey color, the interior smooth and whitish. Peridioles are reddish-brown to black, have minute wrinkles, and dimensions of 0.5–1 mm. The spores are somewhat elliptical, obovate, or pyriform.

- N. shingbaensis

Peridia are 6–9 mm tall by 5–7 mm wide at the mouth. Found in India, it differs from other Nidula in having a six-layered peridium.

== Habitat and distribution ==
Species in Nidula have been found in North America, the Himalayas, and mountains in Japan. N. niveo-tomentosa has been collected at an elevation of 5,000 feet (1,500 m) on Blue Mountains in Jamaica.

== Bioactive compounds ==
The Nidula are known to produce a number of bioactive compounds. N. niveo-tomentosa grown in liquid culture makes niduloic acid (3-hydroxy-5-(p-hydroxyphenol)pentanoic acid), 4-(p-hydroxyphenyl)-2-butanol, trans-4-p-hydroxyphenylbut-3-en-2-one, 4-(3',4'-dihydroxyphenyl)-2-butanol, 4-(3',4'-dihydroxyphenyl)-2-butanone, zingerone, 3-(p-hydroxyphenyl)-1,2-propanediol, and 4-(p-hydroxyphenyl)-2-butanone. The latter compound is commonly known as "raspberry ketone", one of the major chemicals contributing to the flavour of raspberries. This chemical is used (in its acetate form) as an insect attractor in the pesticide Cue-lure, structurally related to the sex pheromone that female melon flies (sp. Bactrocera cucurbitae) use to attract males for mating.

Nidula candida contains the sesquiterpene compounds nidulal and niduloic acid, both of which have weak cytotoxic and antibiotic activities.
