= Sonata Primitive =

Sculpture by Saul Baizerman

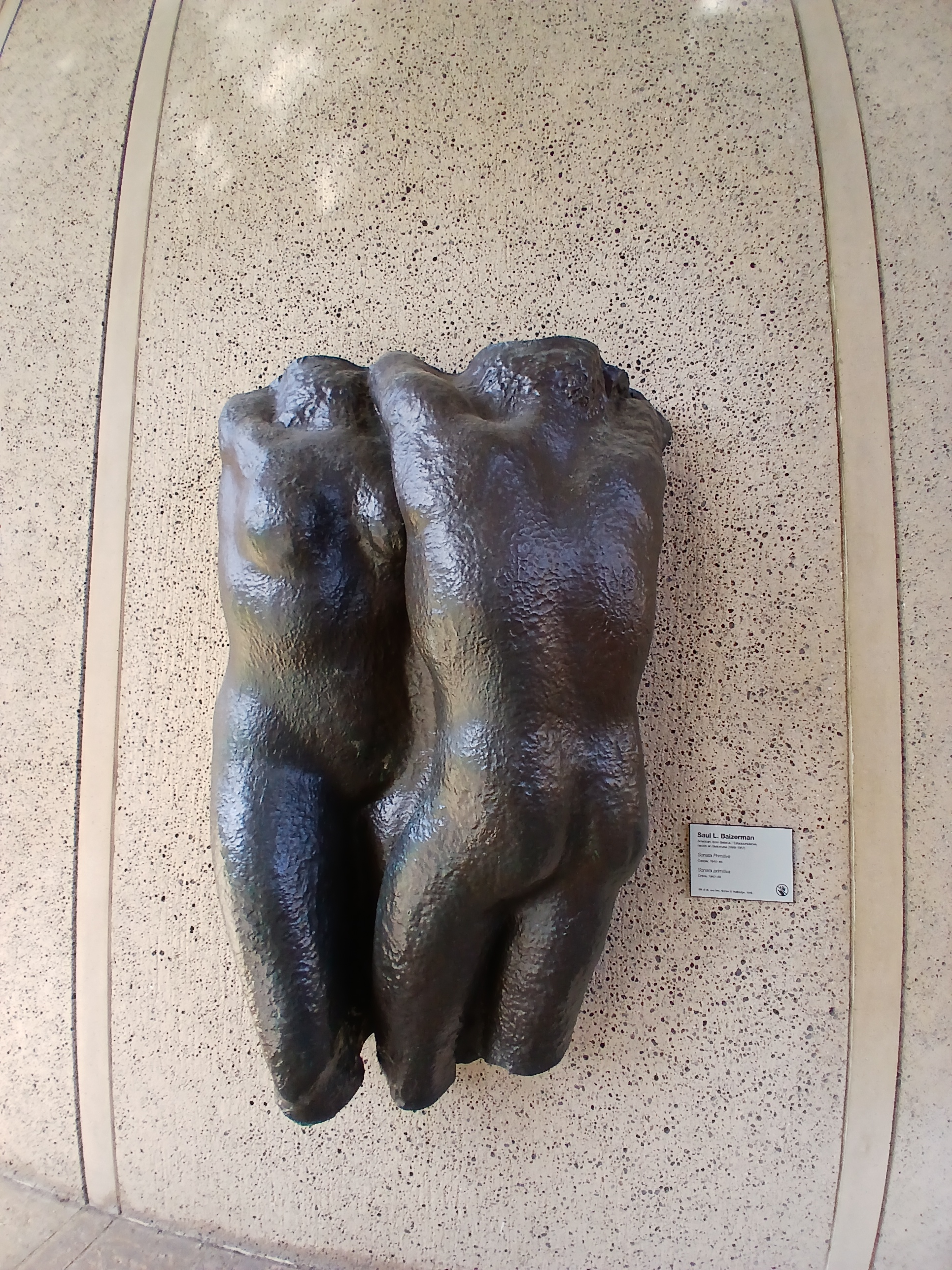
- Artist: Saul Baizerman
- Year: 1940–1948
- Medium: Copper sculpture
- Location: San Diego Museum of Art, San Diego, California, United States
- 32°43′54.4″N 117°9′4.1″W

Sonata Primitive is a copper 1940–1948 sculpture by Saul Baizerman, installed in the San Diego Museum of Art's May S. Marcy Sculpture Garden, in the U.S. state of California.

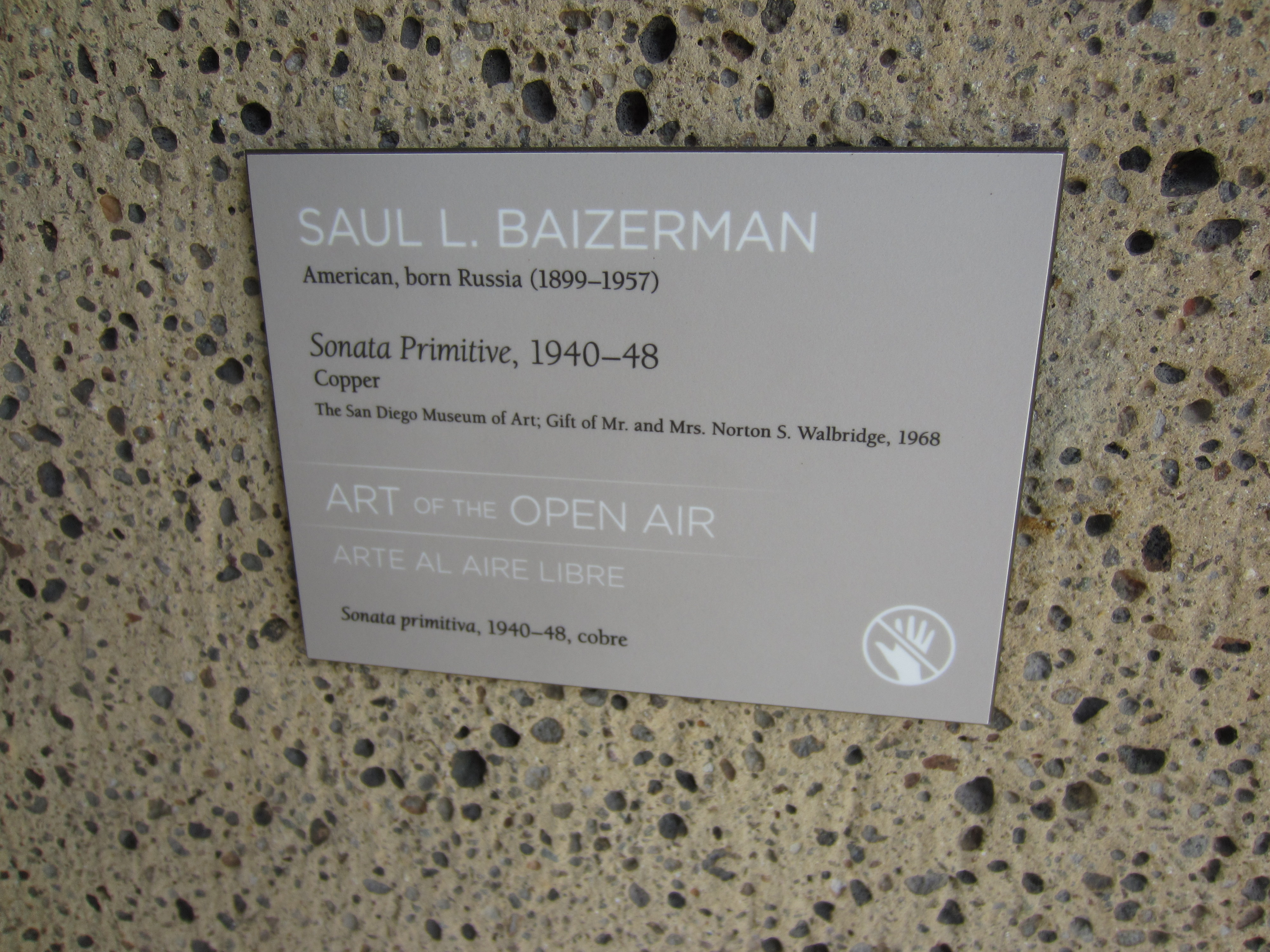

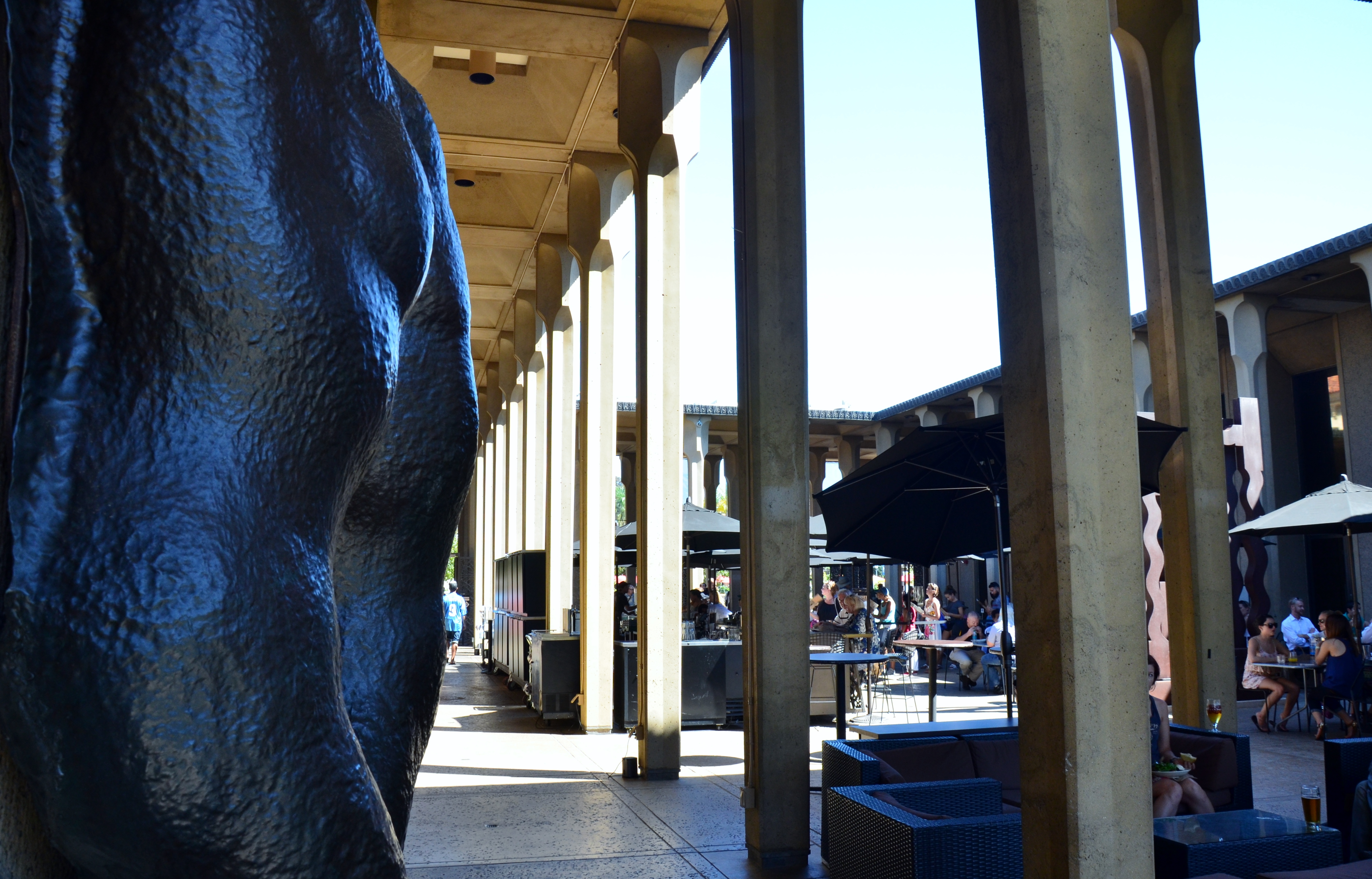
Left Side Angle

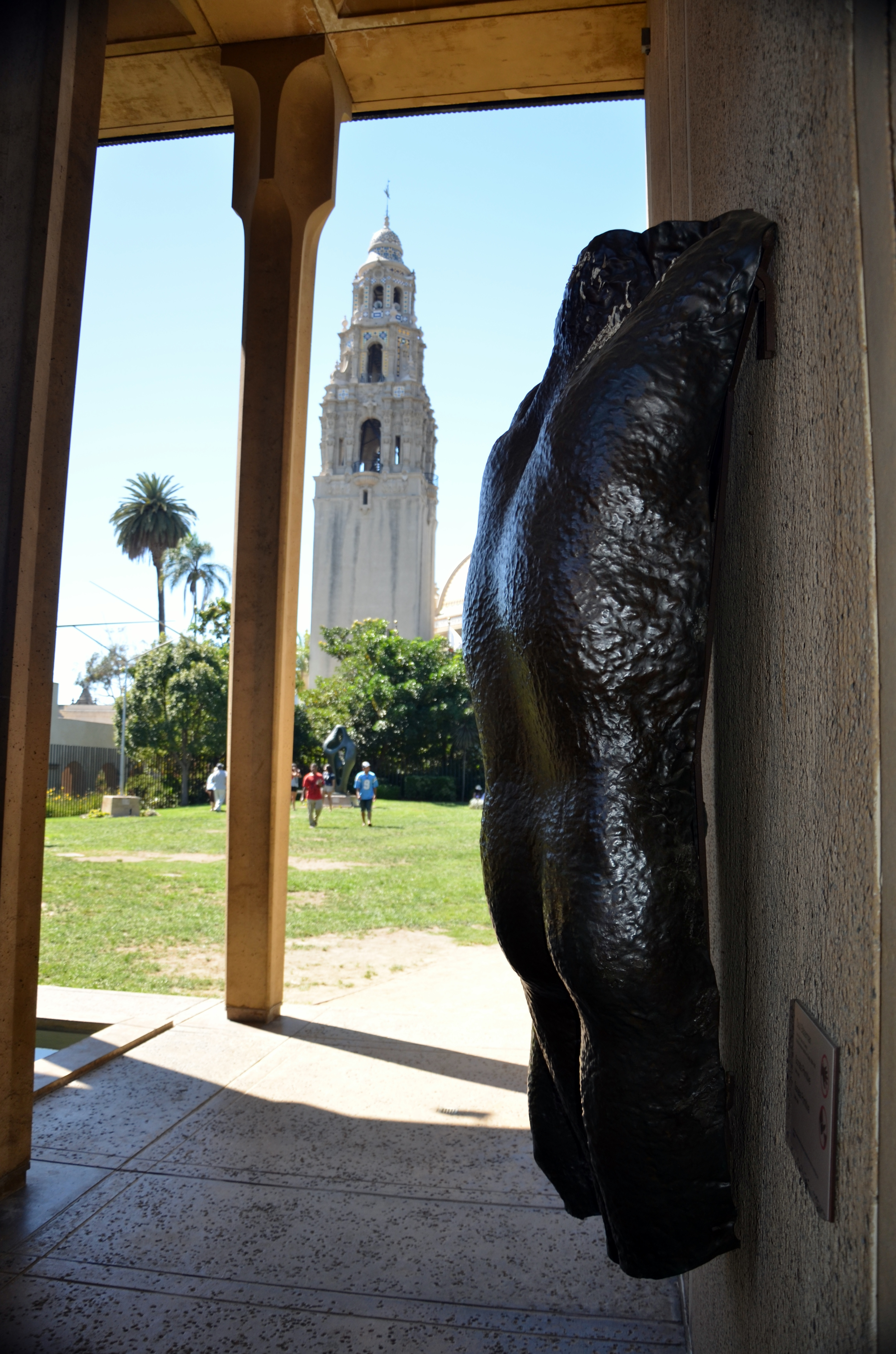
Right Side Angle
