= Mycocalia =

Scientific classification
- Kingdom: Fungi
- Division: Basidiomycota
- Class: Agaricomycetes
- Order: Agaricales
- Family: Nidulariaceae
- Genus: Mycocalia; J.T. Palmer (1961)

Type species
- Mycocalia denudata (Fr.) J.T. Palmer (1961)

Species
- M. denudata M. duriaeana M. minutissima M. sphagneti

Genus of fungi in the Nidulariaceae

Mycocalia denudata

Mycocalia is a genus of fungi in the family Nidulariaceae. Basidiocarps (fruit bodies) are minute (typically under 5 mm in diameter) and irregularly spherical. Each produces one or more peridioles which contain the spores and are released from the disintegrating fruit bodies at maturity. Species are usually found growing on herbaceous stems and other plant debris. The genus was originally described in 1961 by British mycologist J.T. Palmer and has a north temperate distribution.

== Description ==
Species have small barrel- to lens-shaped fruit bodies, 0.5–5 mm broad, that grow singly or in small groups. The peridium consists of loosely interwoven clamped hyphae. The peridioles, of which there may be one to several, are disc-shaped, yellow- to red-brown, and sit in a gelatinous matrix when young and fresh. Spores are elliptical, smooth, and hyaline.

== See also ==
- List of Agaricales genera
