= Harold J. Brodie =

Canadian mycologist

Harold Johnston Brodie
- Born: December 3, 1907; Winnipeg, Manitoba, Canada
- Died: March 20, 1989 (aged 81); Ottawa, Ontario, Canada
- Education: University of Manitoba
- Known for: Advancing the knowledge of the Nidulariacae
- Scientific career
- Fields: Mycology
- Workplaces: University of Manitoba Indiana University at Bloomington University of Alberta
- Doctoral advisor: Arthur Henry Reginald Buller
- Author abbrev. (botany): H.J.Brodie

Harold Johnston Brodie (December 3, 1907 – March 23, 1989) was a Canadian mycologist, known for his contributions to the knowledge of the Nidulariaceae, or bird's nest fungi.

== Early life ==
Harold Brodie was born in Winnipeg, Manitoba, Canada, on December 3, 1907, and grew up there. After receiving his BSc from the University of Manitoba in 1929, he worked on his MSc under the direction of Arthur Henry Reginald Buller. In this research he investigated the functions of the oidia of the mushroom Coprinus lagopus (now known as Coprinopsis radiata); this research led to the two publications in 1931 and 1932.

== Awards ==
Brodie was awarded a Guggenheim fellowship in 1952. He also received the Canada Centennial Medal in 1967, and the Lawson Medal of the Canadian Botanical Association in 1977.

== Works ==
- Brodie, Harold J. (1975). The Bird's Nest Fungi. Toronto: University of Toronto Press. ISBN 0-8020-5307-6.
- Brodie, Harold J. (1989). Fungi: Delight of Curiosity. Toronto: University of Toronto Press. ISBN 0-8020-6766-2; pbk edition 1st edition. 1978; xii+131 pages
