= Saul Baizerman =

American artist (1889–1957)

Saul J. Baizerman (1889–1957) was a Russian-born American sculptor. He was married to the Abstract Impressionist Eugenie Baizerman. His work is included in the collections of the Smithsonian American Art Museum, the Addison Gallery of American Art, the Getty Museum, the Hirshhorn Museum and Sculpture Garden, the San Diego Museum of Art, and the Walker Art Center.

Baizerman was born on December, 25, 1889. Baizerman studied at the Imperial Art School in the Russian Empire before moving to the United States at the age of 20. From 1920 until his death, he lived and worked in a studio on Sixth Avenue (near 3rd Street) in Greenwich Village, New York City. He was noted for making massive sculptures in hammered copper. During his lifetime, his work was exhibited in one-man shows abroad and at home, and in group shows at The Museum of Modern Art and The Whitney Museum of American Art.

Baizerman died at the age of 67 of cancer on August 30, 1957, at Saint Vincent's Catholic Medical Center (then known as St. Vincent's Hospital) in Manhattan.

== Notable works ==
- Sonata Primitive
