= Lockrem Johnson =

American composer

Seattle-based Lockrem Johnson (1924, Davenport, Iowa – 1977) was an American composer. He studied at The Cornish School from 1931-38 with Berthe Poncy Jacobson and at the University of Washington from 1938-42 with George McKay. His one-act chamber opera A Letter to Emily (1951) was runner up for the Pulitzer Prize for Music in 1952. Regarding an incident in the life of poet Emily Dickinson, the libretto was adapted by the composer from the play Consider the Lilies by Robert Hupton. Johnson returned to Seattle in 1962 to become head of the music department at The Cornish School, remaining in that position until 1969. He founded Puget Music Publications in 1970, devoted to publishing works by composers from the American Northwest.

Other works:

- Flower Drum Song
- She

== Bibliography ==
- Butterworth, Neil. "Dictionary of American Classical Composers". London, Routledge, 2013.
