= Eugenie Baizerman =

American artist (1899–1949)

- Born: Eugenie Silverman; October 14, 1899; Warsaw, Poland
- Died: December 30, 1949 (aged 50); New York, New York
- Known for: Painting
- Movement: Abstract Impressionism
- Spouse: Saul Baizerman

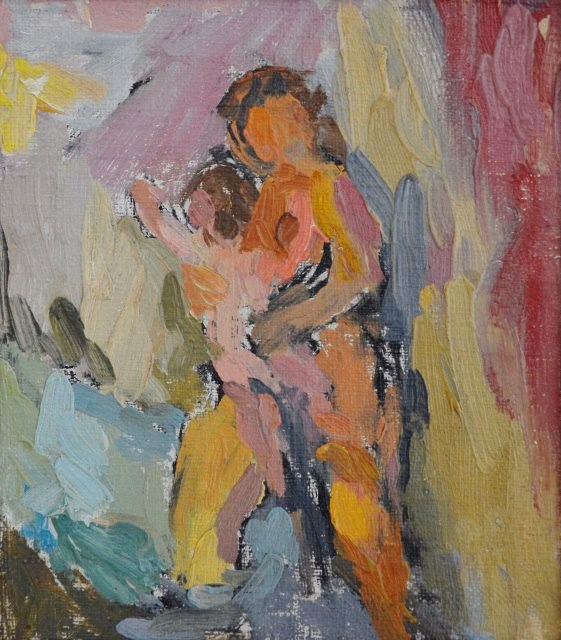
Mother and Child, c. 1949

Eugenie Baizerman (1899–1949) was an American artist.

== Biography ==
Baizerman (née Silverman) was born on October 14, 1899, in Warsaw, Poland. Her family subsequently moved to Russia (to Bessarabia and Odessa), where Baizerman studied at the Grekov Odessa Art school.

In 1914, the family moved to New York City, where she continued her art studies at National Academy of Design and the Educational Alliance. In 1920, she met fellow artist Saul Baizerman. The two married and had one child.

Baizerman exhibited infrequently. She had two solo shows at the Artists Gallery, one in 1938 and one in 1950, which she did not live to see. She was included in an Artists Gallery show with her husband in 1948.

Baizerman died on December 30, 1949, in New York City.

== Style ==
Baizerman style is based in Impressionism, but uses broader brushstrokes and bolder colors. She has been described as an Abstract Impressionist.

== Legacy ==
The Krasner Gallery held a posthumous show of her work in 1964, and she was included in a show at the Zabriskie Gallery in 1988. The Zabriskie held a retrospective in 2000.

Her work is in the collections of the Metropolitan Museum of Art, the Whitney Museum of American Art and the Museum of Modern Art.
