= Louise H. Burchfield =

American art curator (1888-1982)

- Born: August 9, 1888; Akron, Ohio, U.S.
- Died: July 19, 1982 (aged 93); Salem, Ohio, U.S.
- Occupations: Curator; art historian
- Relatives: Charles E. Burchfield (brother)
- Awards: Guggenheim Fellowship (1952)

Academic background
- Education: Case Institute of Technology

Academic work
- Sub-discipline: Miniature portrait paintings
- Institutions: Cleveland Museum of Art

Louise Howell Burchfield (August 9, 1888 – July 19, 1982) was an American curator and art historian. Specializing in miniature portrait paintings, she published Portrait Miniatures: The Edward B. Greene Collection alongside William M. Milliken in 1951, and as a 1952 Guggenheim Fellow studied several miniature paintings collections throughout Europe and the US. She was a curator at the Cleveland Museum of Art from 1941 until her retirement in 1954.

== Biography ==
Louise Howell Burchfield was born on August 9, 1888 (Note: While Yuhuan Zhang gives a birth year of 1898, contemporary sources suggest an earlier birth year of 1888.) in Akron, Ohio, one of five children born to Alice (née Murphy) and painter William Charles Burchfield. She was the family's middle child, and her younger brother was painter Charles E. Burchfield.

In September 1924, Burchfield joined the Cleveland Museum of Art (CMA). Originally starting as an assistant at the registration department, she later worked as a secretary and later assistant at both the department of paintings and decorative arts and the subsequent paintings department. She became an assistant curator in 1941 before being promoted to associate curator in 1950; she was based in the paintings department in the latter position.

Burchfield spent several years as director of the CMOA's annual exhibition, the May Show. In the 1930s and 1940s, she was involved in dozens of traveling exhibitions featuring May Show content, which appeared in 27 states. Reporting for The Plain Dealer, Grace V. Kelly reported that the city's artists "become increasingly aware of their debt" to Burchfield due to her work with the May Show. She also served as manager of businessman Edward B. Greene's portrait miniature collection when it was donated to CMA; she and William M. Milliken curated the associated catalogue Portrait Miniatures: The Edward B. Greene Collection, which was released in 1951. In July 1954, she retired from CMA after almost three decades with them.

Burchfield specialized in the study of miniature portrait paintings. She was appointed honorary member of the Royal Society of Miniature Painters, Sculptors and Gravers in 1949. In 1952, she was awarded a Guggenheim Fellowship for "studies of the history, techniques and aesthetics of the portrait miniature"; she was the first Cleveland native to win one, as well as the first CMA staff member. To prepare for her Guggenheim Fellowship research, she attended the Case Institute of Technology graduate school's courses in art and language. Her research trip involved several collections of miniature paintings throughout Europe and the United States, including Drumlanrig Castle, Frederiksborg Castle, Rosenborg Castle, the Royal Collection in Windsor Castle, and the Victoria and Albert Museum. Yuhuan Zhang said that her experience with miniature paintings "proved beneficial in examining Edward B. Greene's extensive collection".

Burchfield lived in Salem, Ohio, where she retired after leaving CMA. She and her sisters represented her father at the 1965 opening of his His Golden Year exhibition at the University of Arizona Museum of Art. She was an Episcopalian, being a member of the Church of Our Saviour in Salem. She also collected seashells during her winter trips to Sanibel Island in Florida, and was a fan of baseball.

Burchfield died on July 19, 1982 of a heart attack at the Salem Convalescent Center in Salem. She was 93.

== Works ==
- (with William M. Milliken) Portrait Miniatures: The Edward B. Greene Collection (1951)
