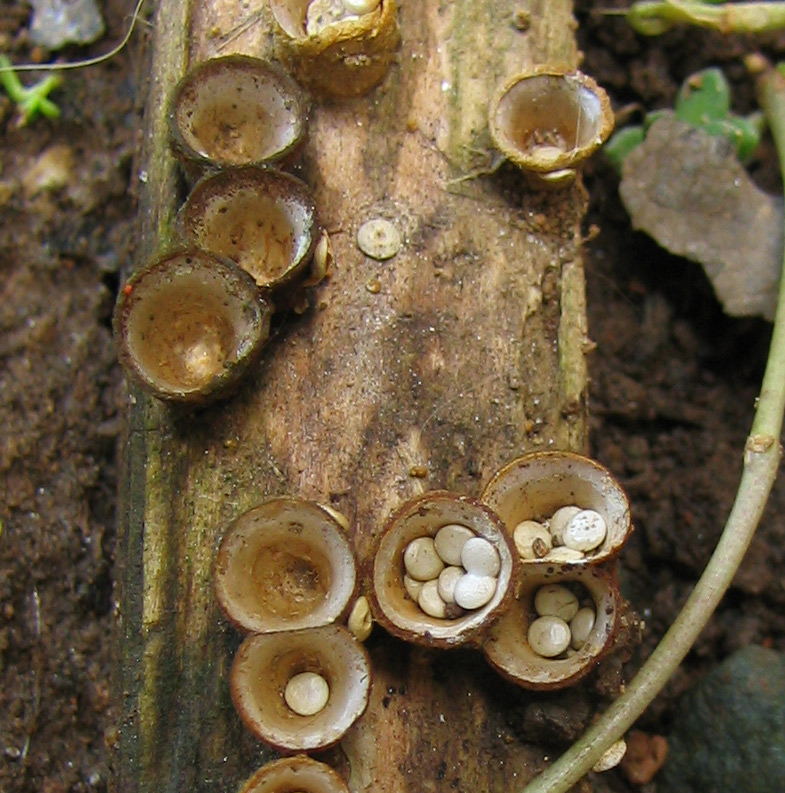
- Bird's nest fungi, Crucibulum laeve

Scientific classification
- Kingdom: Fungi
- Division: Basidiomycota
- Class: Agaricomycetes
- Order: Agaricales
- Family: Nidulariaceae; Dumort. (1822)

Genera
- Crucibulum; Cyathus; Mycocalia; Nidula; Nidularia; Retiperidiola

= Nidulariaceae =

Family of fungi

Nidulariaceae
- Mycological characteristics
- Glebal hymenium
- Cap is infundibuliform
- Hymenium attachment is not applicable
- Lacks a stipe
- Spore print is brown
- Ecology is saprotrophic
- Edibility is inedible

The Nidulariaceae (from "nidulus": "small nest") are a family of fungi in the order Agaricales. Commonly known as the bird's nest fungi, their fruiting bodies resemble tiny egg-filled birds' nests. As they are saprobic, feeding on decomposing organic matter, they are often seen growing on decaying wood and in soils enriched with wood chips or bark mulch; they have a widespread distribution in most ecological regions. The five genera within the family, namely, Crucibulum, Cyathus, Mycocalia, Nidula, and Nidularia, are distinguished from each other by differences in morphology and peridiole structure; more recently, phylogenetic analysis and comparison of DNA sequences is guiding new decisions in the taxonomic organization of this family.

== History ==
Bird's nest fungi were first mentioned by Flemish botanist Carolus Clusius in Rariorum plantarum historia (1601). Over the next couple of centuries, these fungi were the subject of some controversy regarding whether the peridioles were seeds, and the mechanism by which they were dispersed in nature. For example, the French botanist Jean-Jacques Paulet, in his work Traité des champignons (1790–1793), proposed the erroneous notion that peridioles were ejected from the fruiting bodies by some sort of spring mechanism.

== Description ==
The Nidulariaceae have a gasteroid fruiting body, meaning that the spores develop internally, as in an angiocarp. Fruiting bodies are typically gregarious (growing together in groups, but not joined). Young fruiting bodies are initially covered by a thin membrane that dehisces irregularly or by a circumscissile split, in a circular line around the circumference of the cup opening. Fruiting bodies (also called peridia) are small, generally 5–15 mm (0.20–0.59 in) wide and 4–8 mm (0.16–0.31 in) high, urn- or vase-shaped, and contain one to several disc-shaped peridioles that resemble tiny eggs. This fungus is inedible.

Peridiole structure

Peridioles contain glebal tissue, basidia, and basidiospores, surrounded by a hardened wall. They are commonly lenticular in shape (like a biconvex lens), measuring 1–3 mm (0.039–0.12 in) in diameter. The color of the peridioles is characteristic of the genera: Cyathus has black peridioles, Nidularia and Nidula have brown peridioles, Mycocalia has yellow- to red-brown peridioles, and Crucibulum has black peridioles that are surrounded by a whitish membrane called the tunica, which makes them appear white. In most species, the peridioles are dispersed by rain, but they may also be free in the peridium, surrounded by a jelly-like mucilage.

Microscopic characteristics

Basidiospores are oval or elliptical in shape, smooth, hyaline, and thin-walled.

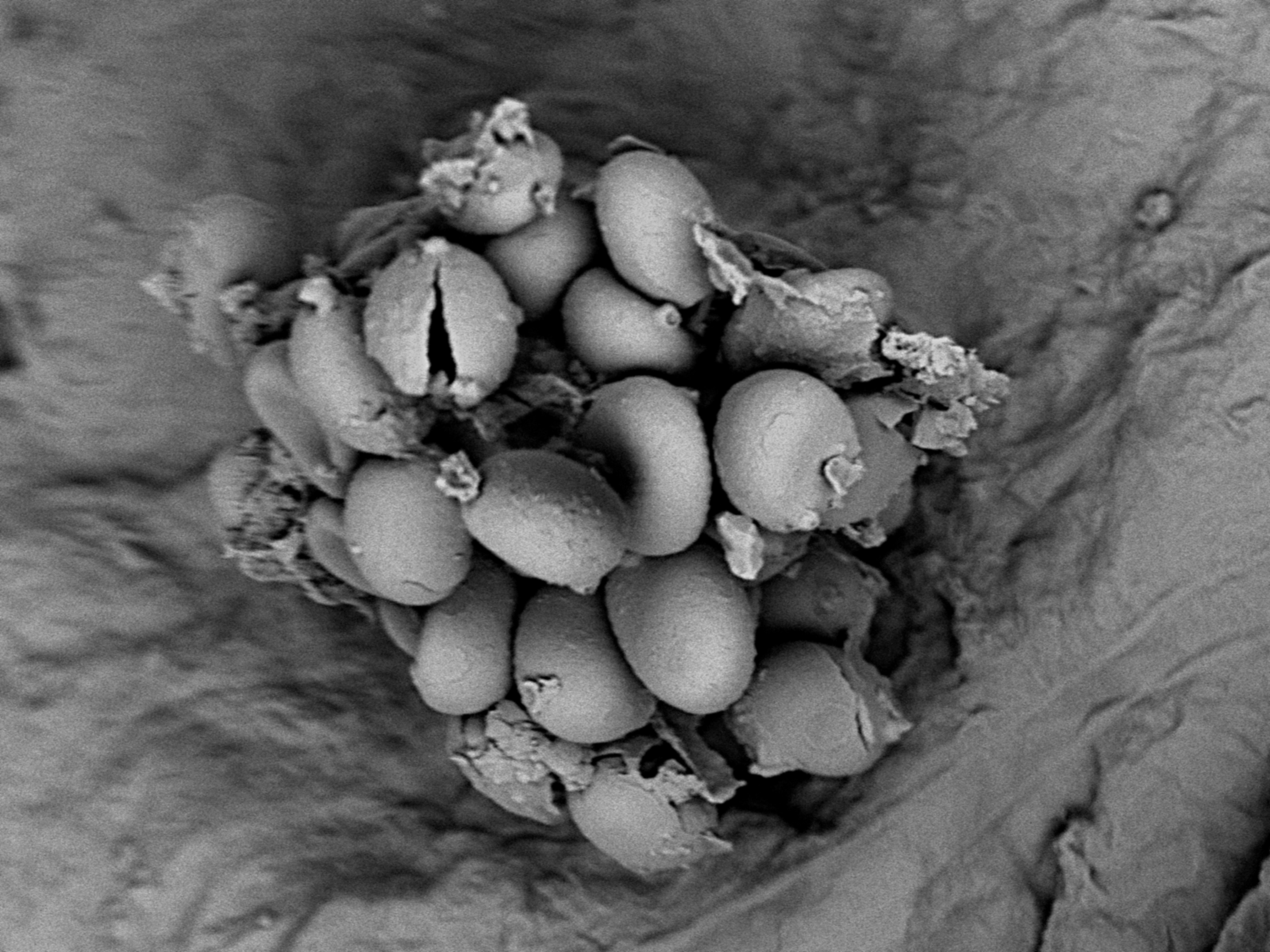
SEM image showing an enlarged view of the basidiospores on peridiole of bird's nest fungi

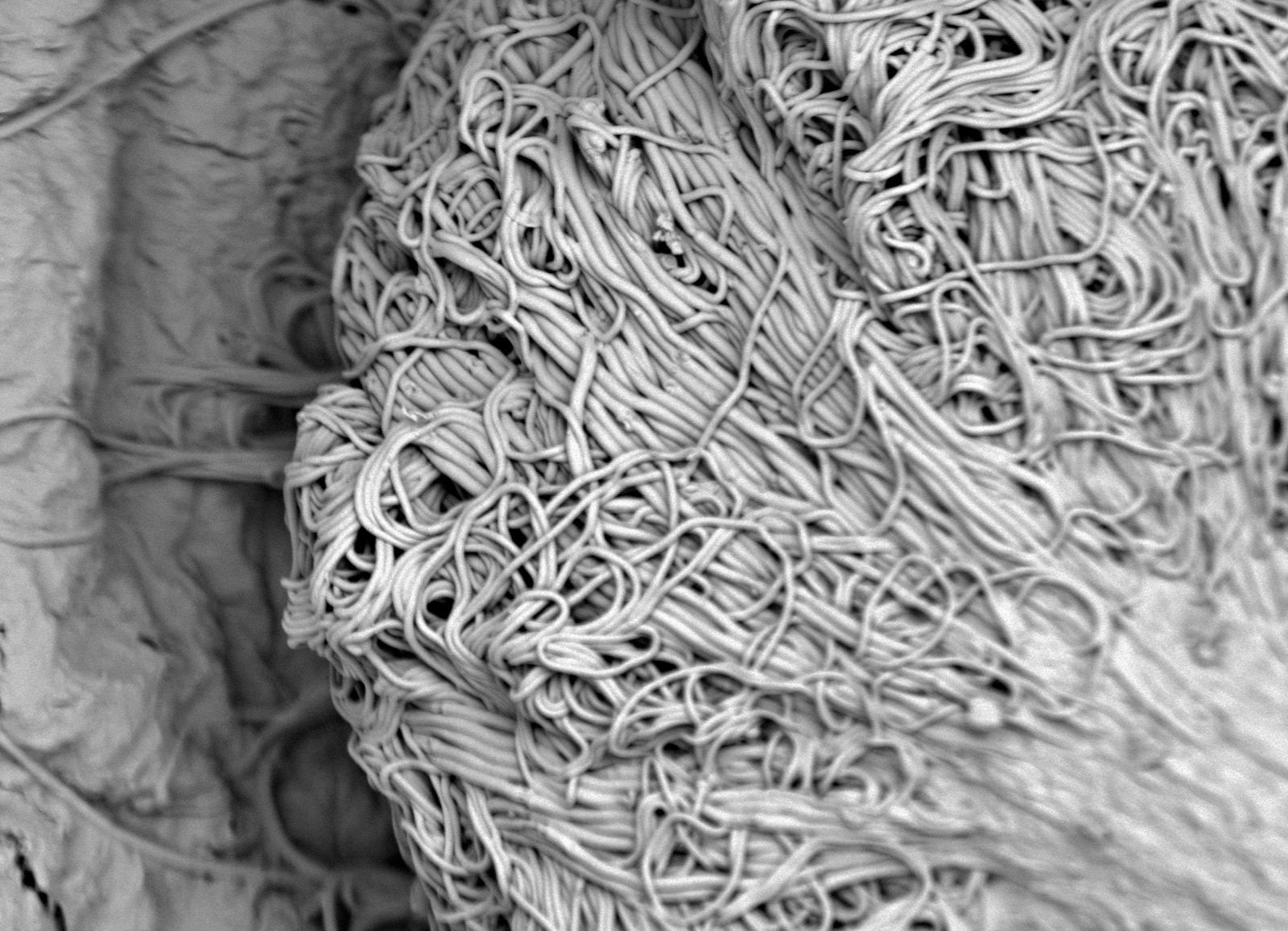
SEM image of the funicular cord on the peridiole of bird's nest fungi

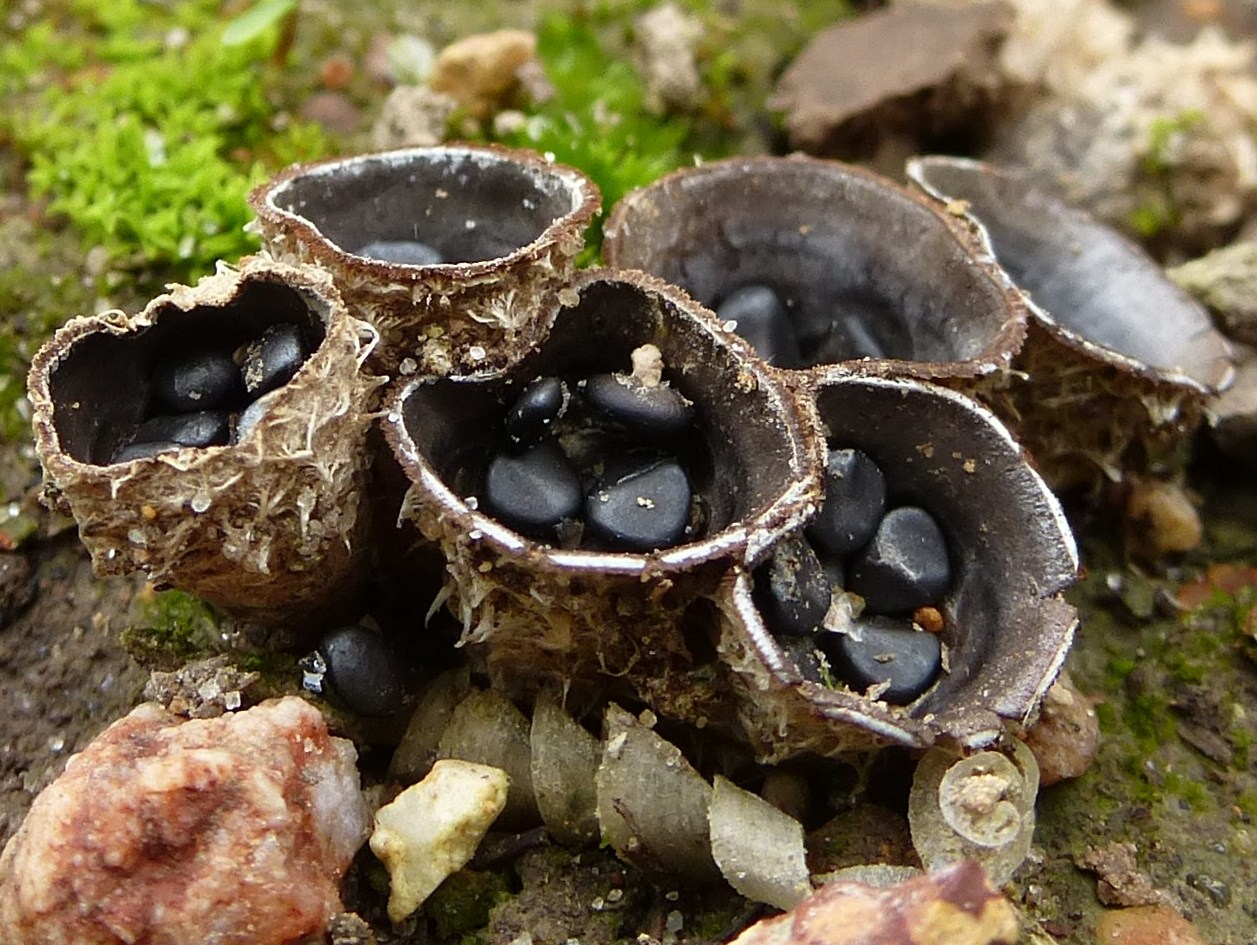
Bird's nest fungi from the Missouri Ozarks

== Habitat and distribution ==
Species in this family are cosmopolitan in distribution, and are largely saprobic, obtaining nutrition from the decomposition of wood and plant organic matter.

== Life cycle ==
The life cycle of the Nidulariaceae, which contains both haploid and diploid stages, is typical of taxa in the basidiomycetes that can reproduce both asexually (via vegetative spores), or sexually (with meiosis). Like other wood-decay fungi, this life cycle may be considered as two functionally different phases: the vegetative stage for the spread of mycelia, and the reproductive stage for the establishment of spore-producing structures, the fruiting bodies.

The vegetative stage encompasses those phases of the life cycle involved with the germination, spread, and survival of the mycelium. Spores germinate under suitable conditions of moisture and temperature, and grow into branching filaments called hyphae, pushing out like roots into the rotting wood. These hyphae are homokaryotic, containing a single nucleus in each compartment; they increase in length by adding cell-wall material to a growing tip. As these tips expand and spread to produce new growing points, a network called the mycelium develops. Mycelial growth occurs by mitosis and the synthesis of hyphal biomass. When two homokaryotic hyphae of different mating compatibility groups fuse with one another, they form a dikaryotic mycelia in a process called plasmogamy. Prerequisites for mycelial survival and colonization in a substrate (like rotting wood) include suitable humidity and nutrient availability. The majority of Nidulariaceae species are saprobic, so mycelial growth in rotting wood is made possible by the secretion of enzymes that break down complex polysaccharides (such as cellulose and lignin) into simple sugars that can be used as nutrients.

After a period of time and under the appropriate environmental conditions, the dikaryotic mycelia may enter the reproductive stage of the life cycle. Fruiting body formation is influenced by external factors such as season (which affects temperature and air humidity), nutrients and light. As fruiting bodies develop they produce peridioles containing the basidia upon which new basidiospores are made. Young basidia contain a pair of haploid sexually compatible nuclei which fuse, and the resulting diploid fusion nucleus undergoes meiosis to produce basidiospores, each containing a single haploid nucleus. The dikaryotic mycelia from which the fruiting bodies are produced is long-lasting, and will continue to produce successive generations of fruiting bodies as long as the environmental conditions are favorable.

== Spore dispersal ==
The nests are "splash-cups". When a raindrop hits one at the right angle, the walls are shaped such that the eggs are expelled to about 1 m (3 ft 3 in) away from the cup in some species. Some species have a sticky trailing thread, a funicular cord, attached to the peridiole. If that thread encounters a twig on its flight, the peridiole will swing around and wrap itself around the twig. The spores are thought to be ingested by herbivores and grow in their droppings to continue the life cycle.

== Genera ==
There are five genera in the Nidulariaceae:

Crucibulum

Fruiting bodies light tan to cinnamon-colored, cup- or crucible-shaped, and typically 1.5–10 mm wide by 5–12 mm tall.

Cyathus

Fruiting bodies vase-, trumpet- or urn-shaped with dimensions of 4–8 mm wide by 7–18 mm tall. Fruiting bodies are brown to gray-brown in color, and covered with small hair-like structures on the outer surface. Complex funicular cord.

Mycocalia

Small barrel- to lens-shaped fruiting bodies, usually 0.5–2 mm broad, that grow singly or in small groups.

Nidula

Fruiting bodies between 3–8 mm in diameter, 5–15 mm tall, and cup- or urn-shaped—having almost vertical sides with the lip flared outwards; color ranging from white, grey, buff, or tawny.

Nidularia

Typically 0.5–6 mm in diameter x 0.5–3 mm tall. They may be somewhat irregular in shape, or have a well-formed cup that is thin and fragile. No funicular cord.

== Phylogenetics ==
The Nidulariaceae were formerly classified in the class Gasteromycetes, but this class has been shown to be polyphyletic, and an artificial assemblage of unrelated taxa that have independently evolved a gasteroid body type. A 2002 phylogenetic study of ribosomal DNA from various gasteroid species, including Cyathus striatus and Crucibulum laeve as representatives of the Nidulariaceae, were shown to belong to the euagarics clade, a monophyletic grouping of species from various genera: Hymenogaster, Hebeloma, Pholiota, Psathyrella, Agaricus campestris, Amanita, and Tulostoma. The euagarics are mostly gilled mushrooms, but they do include two gasteroid lineages, including a puffball lineage in the Lycoperdales, and the bird's nest fungi in the Nidulariales.
