= Homokaryotic =

Type of cell

In mycology, homokaryotic describes a fungal cell, spore, or mycelium containing nuclei of a single genetic type, such as a single mating type. In filamentous fungi, such nuclei occur within multinucleate hyphal compartments sharing a common cytoplasm.

== See also ==
- Dikaryon
- Eukaryote
- Prokaryote
