= Index of oncology articles =

This is a list of terms related to Oncology. The original source for this list was the US National Cancer Institute's public domain Dictionary of Cancer Terms.

== 0–9 ==
10-propargyl-10-deazaaminopterin – 12-O-tetradecanoylphorbol-13-acetate – 13-cis retinoic acid – 17-N-allylamino-17-demethoxygeldanamycin – 18F-EF5 – 1H-nuclear magnetic resonance spectroscopic imaging – 2-methoxyestradiol – 2IT-BAD monoclonal antibody 170 – 3-aminopyridine-2-carboxaldehyde thiosemicarbazone – 3-AP – 3-dimensional conformal radiation therapy – 3-dimensional radiation therapy – 4-demethoxydaunorubicin – 4-hydroxytamoxifen – 4-nitroquinoline 1-oxide – 4-NQO – 5-FU – 5-hydroxyindoleacetic acid – 5-hydroxytryptamine – 506U78 – 5Q- syndrome – 6-hydroxymethylacylfulvene – 9-cis retinoic acid – 90Y-DOTA-biotin

== A ==
A33 monoclonal antibody – AAP – Abarelix – ABCD rating – ABI-007 – ABT-510 – ABT-751 – ABX-EGF – Accelerated phase – ACE inhibitor – Acetylcysteine – Achlorhydria – Acitretin – Acoustic neurofibromatosis – Acridine carboxamide – Acrylonitrile – Actinic keratosis – Action study – Activase – Acute erythroid leukemia – Acute lymphoblastic leukemia – Acute lymphocytic leukemia – Acute myelogenous leukemia – Acute myeloid leukemia – Acute nonlymphocytic leukemia – AD 32 – Adenocarcinoma – Adenoid cystic cancer – Adenoma – Adenopathy – Adenosine triphosphate – Adenovirus – Adjunct agent – Adjunctive therapy – Adjuvant therapy – Adrenocortical – Adriamycin – Adult T-cell leukemia/lymphoma – AE-941 – AEE788 – Aerobic metabolism – Aerobic respiration – Aerodigestive tract – Aerosolize – Aflatoxin – AFP – AG013736 – AG2037 – AG3340 – AG337 – Agent study – Agglutinin – Aggressive lymphoma – Agnogenic myeloid metaplasia – Agonist – Agranulocytosis – AJCC staging system – Alanine aminopeptidase – Alanine transferase – Alanosine – Aldesleukin – Alemtuzumab – Alendronate sodium – Alkalinization – Alkylating agent – ALL – All-trans retinoic acid – Allogeneic – Allogeneic bone marrow transplantation – Allogeneic stem cell transplantation – Allogenic – Allopurinol – Allovectin-7 – Aloe-emodin – Alopecia – Alpha-fetoprotein – Alteplase – Altretamine – Aluminium sulfate – ALVAC-CEA vaccine – Amanita phalloides – Ambien – Amelanotic melanoma – Ames, Bruce – Amifostine – Amikacin – Aminocamptothecin – Aminoglutethimide – Aminoglycoside antibiotic – Aminolevulinic acid – Aminopterin – AML – Amonafide – Amoxicillin – Amphotericin B – Ampulla – Ampulla of Vater – Amputation – Amsacrine – Amylase – Amyloidosis – Anagrelide – Anakinra – Anaphylactic shock – Anaplastic – Anaplastic large cell lymphoma – Anaplastic thyroid cancer – Anastomosis – Anastrozole – Androgen – Androgen ablation – Androgen suppression – Androgen-independent – Anecdotal report – Anemia – Anetholtrithione – Angelica root – Angiogenesis – Angiogenesis inhibitor – Angioimmunoblastic T-cell lymphoma – Angiosarcoma – Angiostatin – Angiotensin-converting enzyme inhibitor – Anhydrovinblastine – Anidulafungin – Animal model – Annamycin – Anorexia (symptom) – Ansamycin – Antagonist – Anterior mediastinotomy – Anterior mediastinum – Anthracenedione – Anthracycline – Anthraquinone – Anti-angiogenesis – Anti-CEA antibody – Anti-idiotype vaccine – Anti-inflammatory – Anti-thymocyte globulin – Antiandrogen – Antiandrogen therapy – Antiangiogenic – Antibody – Antibody therapy – Anticachexia – Anticancer antibiotic – Anticarcinogenic – Anticoagulant – Anticonvulsant – Antidepressant – Antiemetic – Antiestrogen – Antifolate – Antifungal medication – Antigen – Antigen-presenting cell – Antigen-presenting cell vaccine – Antiglobulin test – Antihormone therapy – Antimetabolite – Antimicrotubule agent – Antimitotic agent – Antineoplastic – Antineoplastic antibiotic – Antioxidant – Antiparasitic – Antiretroviral therapy – Antisense c-fos – Antituberculosis – Antitumor antibiotic – Antiviral drug – Anxiolytic – APC (gene) – APC vaccine – APC8015 – Apheresis – Aplastic anemia – Aplidine – Apocrine gland – Apolizumab – Apoptosis – Appendix – Arctigenin – Arctiin – Arginine butyrate – Aromatase inhibitor – Arsenic trioxide – Arteriogram – Arteriography – Asbestos – Ascites – Asparaginase – Aspartate transaminase – Aspergillosis – Aspergillus – Asthenia – Astrocyte – Astrocytoma – Asymptomatic – Atamestane – Ataxia-telangiectasia – Ataxia – Ataxic gait – Atelectasis – Athymic nude mouse – ATLL – ATP – Atrasentan – ATRT atypical teratoid/rhabdoid tumor – Atypical hyperplasia – Augmerosen – Autoimmune disease – Autologous – Autologous bone marrow – Autologous bone marrow transplantation – Autologous lymphocyte – Autologous stem cell transplantation – Autologous tumor cell – Avastin – Axilla – Axillary artery – Axillary bud – Axillary dissection – Axillary lymph node – Axillary lymph node dissection – Axillary nerve – Axillary vein – Azacitidine – Azoxymethane – AZQ – AZT

== B ==
B cell – B lymphocyte – B3 antigen – B43-PAP immunotoxin – B7-1 – Bacillus Calmette Guérin – Bacterial toxin – Barium enema – Barium solution – Barium swallow – Barrett's esophagus – Basal cell – Basal cell carcinoma – Basal cell nevus syndrome – Basophil – Batimastat – BAY 12-9566 – BAY 43-9006 – BAY 56-3722 – BAY 59-8862 – BB-10901 – BBBD – BBR 2778 – BBR 3464 – BCG – BCG solution – Bcl-2 antisense oligodeoxynucleotide G3139 – BCX-1777 – Beckwith-Wiedemann syndrome – Beclomethasone – Bellini duct carcinoma – Bendamustine – Benign – Benign proliferative breast disease – Benign prostatic hyperplasia – Benign prostatic hypertrophy – Benign tumor – Benzaldehyde – Benzoylphenylurea – Benzydamine – Beriplast P – Best practice – Beta alethine – Beta carotene – Beta hemolytic streptococcus group B – Beta-endorphin – Beta-glucan – Beta-human chorionic gonadotropin – Bevacizumab – Bexarotene – Bexxar regimen – BG00001 – BI-RADS – Biafine cream – BIBX 1382 – Bicalutamide – Bidi (oncology) – Bilateral cancer – Bilateral nephrectomy – Bilateral prophylactic mastectomy – Bilateral salpingo-oophorectomy – Bile duct – Biliary – Bilirubin – Binding agent – Bioavailable – Biochanin A – Biochemical reactions – Biological response modifier – Biological therapy – Biomarker – Biomed 101 – Biopsy – Biopsy specimen – Biotherapy – Birt–Hogg–Dube syndrome – Bispecific antibody – Bispecific monoclonal antibody – Bisphosphonate – Bizelesin – BL22 immunotoxin – Black cohosh – Black snakeroot – Blast cell – Blast crisis – Blast phase – Bleomycin – Blessed thistle – Blinded study – Blood cell count – Blood chemistry study – Blood thinner – Blood transfusion – Blood–brain barrier – Blood–brain barrier disruption – BMS-182751 – BMS-184476 – BMS-188797 – BMS-214662 – BMS-247550 – BMS-275291 – BMS-354825 – Bolus (medicine) – Bolus infusion – Bone marrow – Bone marrow ablation – Bone marrow aspiration – Bone marrow biopsy – Bone marrow metastases – Bone marrow transplantation – Bone metastases – Bone scan – Bone-seeking radioisotope – Boron neutron capture therapy – Boronophenylalanine-fructose complex – Bortezomib – Bowen's disease – BPH – Brachial plexopathy – Brachial plexus – Brachytherapy – Brain metastasis – Brain stem tumor – Brain tumor – Brainstem glioma – BRCA1 – BRCA2 – Breakthrough pain – Breast cancer in situ – Breast density – Breast duct endoscopy – Breast Imaging Reporting and Data System – Breast implant – Breast reconstruction – Breast self-exam – Breast-conserving surgery – Breast-sparing surgery – Brief Pain Inventory – BRIP1 – Brivudine – BRM – Bromelain – Bronchiole – Bronchitis – Bronchoscope – Bronchoscopy – Bronchus – Brostallicin – Broxuridine – Bryostatin 1 – Buccal mucosa – Budesonide – Bupropion – Burdock – Burkitt's leukemia – Burkitt's lymphoma – Burr hole – Buserelin – Buspirone – Busulfan – Buthionine sulfoximine

== C ==
C cell – C-erbB-2 – C-kit – CA 19-9 assay – CA-125 – CA-125 test – Cachexia – Calcitonin – Calcitriol – CAM – Campath-1H – Camptothecin – Camptothecin analog – Cancer – Cancer induction – Cancer Information Service – Cancer of unknown primary origin – Cancer stem cell – Cancer vaccine – Cancer.gov – Candidiasis – Candidosis – CAP-1 – Capecitabine – Capsaicin – Captopril – Carbendazim – Carbogen – Carbon-11 acetate – Carboplatin – Carboxyamidotriazole – Carboxypeptidase-G2 – Carcinoembryonic antigen – Carcinoembryonic antigen peptide-1 – Carcinogen – Carcinogenesis – Carcinoid – Carcinoid syndrome – Carcinoma – Carcinoma in situ – Carcinomatosis – Carcinosarcoma – Carcinosis – Carcinostatic – Cardin (oncology) – Carmustine – Carnitine – Carotenoid – Carzelesin – Case-control study – Case report – Case series – Caspofungin acetate – Castleman's disease – CAT scan – Catechol – Cauterization – Cauterize – CBR96-doxorubicin immunoconjugate – CC-1088 – CC-49 monoclonal antibody – CC-5013 – CC-8490 – CCI-779 – CD34 antigen – CD40-ligand – CEA – CEA assay – Cecum – Cefalexin – Cefepime – Cefixime – Ceftriaxone – Celecoxib – Celiac disease – Cell (biology) – Cell adhesion – Cell adhesion molecule – Cell differentiation – Cell motility – Cell proliferation – Cell respiration – Cellular adoptive immunotherapy – Cellular metabolism – Cellulitis – Central nervous system – Central nervous system primitive neuroectodermal tumor – Central venous access catheter – CEP-2563 dihydrochloride – CEP-701 – Cephalosporin – Ceramide – Cerebellar hemangioblastoma – Cerebellopontine – Cerebral hemisphere – Cerebrospinal fluid – Cerebrospinal fluid diversion – Cervical – Cervical intraepithelial neoplasia – Cervix – Cetuximab – Cevimeline – CGP 48664 – Chamberlain procedure – Chemoembolization – Chemoimmunotherapy – Chemoprevention – Chemoprevention studies – Chemoprotective – Chemoradiation – Chemoradiotherapy – Chemosensitivity – Chemosensitivity assay – Chemosensitizer – Chemotherapeutic agent – Chemotherapy – Chemotherapy-induced peripheral neuropathy – Chest X-ray – Chiasma (genetics) – Child-life worker – Chitin – Chlorambucil – Chlorine – Chloroma – Chloroquinoxaline sulfonamide – Cholangiocarcinoma – Cholangiosarcoma – Cholelith – Cholestasis – Chondrocyte – Chondroitin sulfate – Chondrosarcoma – Chordoma – Chorioallantoic membrane – Choriocarcinoma – Choroid plexus tumor – CHPP – Chronic granulocytic leukemia – Chronic idiopathic myelofibrosis – Chronic leukemia – Chronic lymphoblastic leukemia – Chronic lymphocytic leukemia – Chronic myelogenous leukemia – Chronic myeloid leukemia – Chronic myelomonocytic leukemia – Chronic phase – Chronic phase chronic myelogenous leukemia – CHS 828 – CI-1033 – CI-958 – CI-980 – CI-994 – Ciclosporin – Cidofovir – Cilengitide – Cimetidine – Cipro – Ciprofloxacin – Circulating tumor cell – Circulatory system – Cirrhosis – CIS – Cisplatin – Citric acid/potassium-sodium citrate – Cladribine – Clarithromycin – Clear cell adenocarcinoma – Clear cell sarcoma of the kidney – Clear-cell sarcoma – Clinical breast exam – Clinical resistance – Clinical series – Clinical study – Clinical trial – CLL – Clodronate – Clofarabine – CML – CMML – CMV – Cnicin – CNS – CNS metastasis – CNS prophylaxis – CNS sanctuary – CNS tumor – Co-culture – Co-trimoxazole – Coactivated T cell – Cobalt 60 – Cockayne syndrome – Coenzyme Q10 – Cohort study – COL-3 – Cold nodule – Coley's toxins – Collagen disease – Collagenase – Collecting duct – Coloanal anastomosis – Coloanal pull-through – Colon polyp – Colonoscope – Colonoscopy – Colony-stimulating factor – Colorectal – Colorectal cancer (colon cancer) – Colposcope – Colposcopy – Combination chemotherapy – Combretastatin A4 phosphate – Comedo carcinoma – Common bile duct – Comorbidity – Compassionate use trial – Complementary and alternative medicine – Complete blood count (CBC) – Complete hysterectomy – Complete metastasectomy – Complete remission – Complete response – Compound nevus – Compression bandage – Computed tomographic colonography – Computed tomography – Computed tomography colography – Computerized axial tomography – Computerized tomography – Concurrent therapy – Condylomata acuminata – Cone biopsy – Congestive heart failure – Conization – Consecutive case series – Consolidation therapy – Contiguous lymphoma – Continent reservoir – Contingency management – Continuous hyperthermic peritoneal perfusion – Continuous infusion – Contralateral – Control animal – Control group – Controlled clinical trial – Controlled study – Conventional therapy – Conventional treatment – Cooperative group – CoQ10 – Cordectomy – Cordycepin – Core biopsy – Corticosteroid – Corynebacterium granulosum – Coumestan – Coumestrol – CP-358,774 – CP-609,754 – CP-724,714 – CP4071 – CpG 7909 – CPT 11 – CQS – Craniopharyngioma – Craniotomy – Creatine – Creatinine – Cribriform plate – Crisnatol mesylate – Crohn's disease – Cryopreservation – Cryosurgery – Cryotherapy – Cryptorchidism – CSF – CT scan – CT-2103 – CT-2106 – CT-2584 – CTC – Cultured cell – Cultured cell line – Cumulative dose – Curcumin – Cutaneous breast cancer – Cutaneous T-cell lymphoma – Cyanogenic glucoside – Cyclooxygenase-2 selective inhibitor – Cyclophosphamide – Cyclosporine – Cyproheptadine – Cyproterone acetate – Cyst – Cystectomy – Cystosarcoma phyllodes – Cystoscope – Cystoscopy – Cytarabine – Cytochlor – Cytogenetics – Cytokine – Cytomegalovirus – Cytopathology – Cytopenia – Cytoplasm – Cytotoxic – Cytotoxic chemotherapy – Cytotoxic T cell

== D ==
D-20761 – Da-huang – Dacarbazine – Dacliximab – Daclizumab – Dactinomycin – Daidzein – Dalteparin – Danazol – Darbepoetin alfa – Darkfield microscope – Data Safety and Monitoring Committee – Daunorubicin – DCIS – De novo – Death cap – Debulking operation – Decitabine – Decortication – Deferoxamine – Defibrotide – Degenerative disease – Dehydroepiandrosterone – Delayed-type hypersensitivity response – Dendritic cell – Dendritic cell vaccine – Denileukin diftitox – Dental implant – Deoxycytidine – Deoxyribonucleic acid – DepoFoam-encapsulated cytarabine – Depsipeptide – Dermatofibrosarcoma protuberans – Dermatologist – Dermis – DES – Deslorelin – Desmoid tumor – Desmoplastic – Desmoplastic melanoma – Desmoplastic small round cell tumor – Dexamethasone – Dexmethylphenidate – Dexrazoxane – Dextroamphetamine-amphetamine – Dextromethorphan acetic acid – DFMO – DHA-paclitaxel – DHEA – Di-dgA-RFB4 monoclonal antibody – Diagnosis – Diagnostic mammogram – Diagnostic procedures – Diagnostic trial – Diathermy – Diaziquone – Didanosine – DIEP flap – Diethylstilbestrol – Differentiation (cellular) – Difluoromethylornithine – Digital mammography – Digital photography – Digital rectal examination – Dihematoporphyrin ether – Dimesna – Dimethyl sulfoxide – Dimethylxanthenone acetic acid – Diphosphonate – Dipyridamole – Disease-free survival – Disease-specific survival – Disease progression – Distal – Distal pancreatectomy – Distant cancer – Distraction – Disulfiram – DJ-927 – DNA – Docetaxel – Dock – Dolasetron – Dolastatin 10 – Donepezil – Dose-dense chemotherapy – Dose-dependent – Dose-limiting – Dose-rate – Dose (biochemistry) – Dosimetrist – Double-blinded – Double-contrast barium enema – Doubling time – Doxercalciferol – Doxorubicin – Doxycycline – DRE – Dronabinol – Drug tolerance – Dry orgasm – DTGM fusion protein – Ductal carcinoma – Ductal carcinoma in situ – Ductal lavage – Dukes' classification – Dumping syndrome – Duodenitis – DX-52-1 – DX-8951f – Dyscrasia – Dysesthesia – Dysgeusia – Dysphagia – Dysplasia – Dysplastic nevi – Dysplastic nevus – Dyspnea

== E ==
E7070 – E7389 – EBV – Ecchymosis – Echocardiography – Ecteinascidin 743 – Ectocervical – Edatrexate – Edotecarin – Edrecolomab – Efaproxiral – Effector cell – Efficacy – Eflornithine – EGb761 – EGFR – EKB-569 – Electroacupuncture – Electrodesiccation – Electrolarynx – Electroporation therapy – Eligibility criteria – Embolism – Embolization – Embryonic – Embryoma – Embryonal rhabdomyosarcoma – Embryonal tumor – EMD 121974 – Emitefur – Emodin – Enalapril – Encephalopathy – Enchondroma – Endocervical curettage – Endocrine cancer – Endocrine pancreas cell – Endocrine therapy – Endometrial – Endometrial biopsy – Endometrial disorder – Endometrial hyperplasia – Endometrial intraepithelial neoplasia – Endometriosis – Endometrium – Endorectal ultrasound – Endoscope – Endoscopic retrograde cholangiopancreatography – Endoscopic ultrasound – Endoscopy – Endostatin – Endothelial cell – Endothelin-1 protein receptor antagonists – Endothelin receptor antagonist – Eniluracil – Enoxaparin – ENT – Enterostomal therapist – Enucleation (microbiology) – Enveloped virus – Enzyme replacement therapy – Eosinophil – Eosinophilia – EP-2101 – Ependymal tumor – Ependymoma – Epidemiology – Epidermal growth factor receptor – Epidermoid carcinoma – Epigastric – Epiglottis – Epinephrine – Epipodophyllotoxin – Epirubicin – Epithelial – Epithelial carcinoma – Epithelial ovarian cancer – Epithelium – Epitope – EPO906 – Epoetin alfa – Epoetin beta – Epothilone – Epothilone B – Epothilone D – Epratuzumab – Epstein-Barr virus – EPT – ER – ER+ – ER- – ERA-923 – erb-38 immunotoxin – ErbB1 – ERCP – Erlotinib – ERT – ERUS – Erythema – Erythrocyte – Erythrocyte sedimentation rate – Erythrodysplasia – Erythroid dysplasia – Erythroleukemia – Erythroleukoplakia – Erythroplakia – Erythropoietin – Esophagectomy – Esophagitis – Esophagoscopy – Esophagram – Esophagus – Esophageal – ESR – Essential thrombocythemia – Essential thrombocytosis – Estradiol – Estramustine – Estramustine phosphate – Estrogen – Estrogen receptor – Estrogen receptor negative – Estrogen receptor positive – Estrogen receptor test – Estrogen replacement therapy – Etanercept – Etanidazole – Ethynyluracil – Etidronate – Etiology – Etoposide – Etoposide phosphate – ETS – Evaluable disease – Evaluable patients – Everolimus – Ewing's family of tumors – Ewing's sarcoma – Exatecan mesylate – Excision – Excisional biopsy – Exemestane – Exisulind – Exocrine pancreas cell – Expanded access trial – Extensive-stage small cell lung cancer – External-beam radiation – External radiation – Extrahepatic – Extrapleural pneumonectomy

== F ==
False-negative test result – False-positive test result – Familial adenomatous polyposis – Familial atypical multiple mole melanoma syndrome – Familial cancer – Familial dysplastic nevi – Familial polyposis – Family history (medicine) – FAMMM syndrome – Fanconi anemia – Fanconi syndrome – FAP – Fatty-replaced breast tissue – Fazarabine – Fecal occult blood test – Fenretinide – Fentanyl – Fiber – Fibrin sealant – Fibroblast – Fibroma Fibroid – Fibromatosis – Fibrosarcoma – Fibrosis – Fibrous – Fifth cranial nerve – Filgrastim-SD/01 – Filgrastim – Finasteride – Fine-needle aspiration – First-line therapy – FK463 – Flavonoid – Flavopiridol – Flecainide – Flow cytometry – Floxuridine – Flt3L – Fluconazole – Flucytosine – Fludarabine – Fludeoxyglucose F 18 – Fludrocortisone – Fluoropyrimidine – Fluoroscope – Fluoroscopy – Fluorouracil – Fluoxetine – Flutamide – FOBT – Folate – Folate antagonist – FOLFOX – Folic acid – Follicular large cell lymphoma – Follicular mixed cell lymphoma – Follicular thyroid cancer – Formaldehyde – FR901228 – Fractionation – Free radical – Fulguration – Fulvestrant – Functional magnetic resonance imaging – Fundus of gallbladder – Fungating lesion – Fusion protein

== G ==
G-CSF – Gabapentin – Gail model – Gallium nitrate – Gallium scan – Gamma knife – Gamma ray – Ganciclovir – Ganglioside – Gastrectomy – Gastric atrophy – Gastrinoma – Gastroenterologist – Gastroesophageal junction – Gastroesophageal reflux disease – Gastrointestinal – Gastrointestinal stromal tumor – Gastrointestinal tract – Gastroscope – Gastroscopy – Gefitinib – Geldanamycin analog – GEM 231 – Gemcitabine – Gemtuzumab ozogamicin – Gene-modified – Gene expression profiling – Gene therapy – Gene transfer – Genetic analysis – Genetic counseling – Genetic deletion – Genetic markers – Genetic susceptibility – Genetic testing – Genistein – Genitourinary system – Genome – Germ cell – Germ cell tumor – German Commission E – Germinoma – Germline mutation – Gerota's capsule – Gerota's fascia – Gestational trophoblastic disease – Gestational trophoblastic neoplasia – Gestational trophoblastic tumor – GI14721 – Giant cell fibroblastoma – Gimatecan – GIST – Gleason score – Gleevec – Gliadel Wafer – Glial cell – Glial tumor – Glioblastoma – Glioblastoma multiforme – Glioma – Gliosarcoma – Glossectomy – Glucagon – Glucagonoma – Glucocorticoid – Gluconeogenesis – Glufosfamide – Glutamine – Glutathione – Glutathione S-transferase – Glycinamide ribonucleotide formyltransferase inhibitor – Glycolysis – Glycopeptide – Glycoprotein – Glycoprotein 100 – Glycosaminoglycan – GM-CSF – GM2-KLH vaccine – GnRH – Gonadotropin-releasing hormone – Gonadotropin-releasing hormone agonist – Gonzalez regimen – Gorlin syndrome – Goserelin – Gossypol – Gp100 – Gp209-2M – GPX-100 – Grade IV astrocytoma – Graft-versus-host disease – Graft-versus-tumor – Granisetron – Granulocyte – Granulocyte colony-stimulating factor – Granulocytic sarcoma – Granulocytopenia – Granulosa cell tumor – Growing teratoma syndrome – GTI-2040 – GVHD – GW572016 – GW786034 – Gynecologic – Gynecologic cancer – Gynecologic oncologist

== H ==
HAART – Hairy cell leukemia – Halofuginone hydrobromide – Halsted radical mastectomy – Hamartoma – Hand-foot syndrome – Head and neck cancer – Hedyotis diffusa – HeLa – Helical computed tomography – Helper T cell – Hemagglutinin-neuraminidase – Hemangiopericytoma – Hemangiosarcoma – Hematogenous – Hematologic malignancy – Hematologist – Hematopoiesis – Hematopoietic growth factor – Hematopoietic tissue – Hematoporphyrin derivative – Hemilaryngectomy – Heparin – Hepatectomy – Hepatic – Hepatic arterial infusion – Hepatic artery – Hepatic portal vein – Hepatic veno-occlusive disease – Hepatoblastoma – Hepatocellular carcinoma – Hepatocyte – Hepatoma – Hepatomegaly – HER1 – HER2/neu – HER2/neu gene – Herba scutellaria barbatae – Hereditary leiomyomatosis and renal cell cancer syndrome – Hereditary mutation – Hereditary non-polyposis colon cancer – Herpesvirus – Heterogenic – Hexyl 5-aminolevulinate – High-dose chemotherapy – High-dose-rate remote brachytherapy – High-dose-rate remote radiation therapy – High-energy photon therapy – High-grade lymphoma – High grade squamous intraepithelial lesion – High-risk cancer – Highly active antiretroviral therapy – Hilum (anatomy) / hilar – Histamine dihydrochloride – Histiocytic lymphoma – Histologic examination – Histology – Histone – Histone deacetylase – Historic cohort study – Historical control subject – HLA – HNPCC – Hodgkin's disease – Hodgkin's lymphoma – Holmium Ho 166 DOTMP – Homoharringtonine – Hormonal therapy – Hormone receptor – Hormone receptor test – Hormone replacement therapy – Hormone responsive – Hormone therapy – Horner's syndrome – Host cell – Hot nodule – HPPH – HPV – HRT – HTLV-1 – Hu14.18-interleukin-2 fusion protein – Huang Lian – Human epidermal growth factor receptor 2 – Human leukocyte antigen – Human lymphocyte antigen – Human papillomavirus – Human T-cell leukemia virus type 1 – Hürthle cell neoplasm – Hydrazine sulfate – Hydromorphone – Hydronephrosis – Hydroureter – Hydroxychloroquine – Hydroxyurea – Hypercalcemia – Hyperfractionation – Hyperglycemia – Hypericum perforatum – Hypernephroma – Hyperplasia – Hypersensitivity – Hyperthermia therapy – Hyperthermic intraperitoneal chemoperfusion – Hyperthermic perfusion – Hyperthyroidism – Hyperuricemia – Hypervascular – Hypoglycemia – Hypopharynx – Hypotension – Hypothalamus – Hypothesis – Hypothyroidism – Hypoxia (medical) / hypoxic – Hysterectomy

== I ==
Ibandronate – ICI 182,780 – ICI D1694 – Idarubicin – IDEC-Y2B8 monoclonal antibody – Idiopathic – Idiopathic myelofibrosis – Idoxifene – Idoxuridine – Ifosfamide – IH636 grape seed extract – IL-1-alfa – IL-1 – IL-11 – IL-12 – IL-2 – IL-3 – IL-4 – IL-6 – Ileostomy – Iloprost – ILX-295501 – ILX23-7553 – IM-862 – Imaging procedure – Imatinib mesylate – Imipenem – Imiquimod – Immune adjuvant – Immune function – Immune response – Immune system – Immune system tolerance – Immunoassay – Immunocompetence – Immunocompetent – Immunocompromised – Immunodeficiency – Immunodeficiency syndrome – Immunoglobulin – Immunological adjuvant – Immunology – Immunomodulation – Immunophenotyping – Immunoscintigraphy – Immunostimulant – Immunosuppression – Immunosuppressive – Immunosuppressive therapy – Immunotherapy – Immunotoxin – In situ cancer – Incisional biopsy – Incomplete Freund's adjuvant – Incontinentia pigmenti – Indinavir – Indium In 111 ibritumomab tiuxetan – Indium In 111 pentetreotide – Indole-3-carbinol – Indolent lymphoma – Indometacin – Induction therapy – Infiltrating cancer – Infiltrating ductal carcinoma – Inflammatory breast cancer – Infliximab – Infrared coagulation – Inguinal orchiectomy – Inoperable – Inositol – Inositol hexaphosphate – Instillation abortion – Institutional review board – Intensification therapy – Intensity Modulated Radiation Therapy – Intercalator – Interferon – Interleukin – Interleukin-1 – Interleukin-1-alpha – Interleukin-11 – Interleukin-12 – Interleukin-2 – Interleukin-3 – Interleukin-4 – Interleukin-4 PE38KDEL cytotoxin – Interleukin-4 PE38KDEL immunotoxin – Interleukin-6 – Interleukin-7 – Intermediate-grade lymphoma – Internal radiation – Interstitial radiation therapy – Intestinal villi – Intoplicine – Intracarotid infusion – Intracavitary – Intracavitary radiation – Intracellular – Intracolonic – Intracranial tumor – Intradermal – Intraductal carcinoma – Intraepithelial – Intrahepatic – Intrahepatic bile ducts – Intrahepatic infusion – Intralesional – Intraluminal intubation and dilation – Intramuscular injection (IM) – Intraocular melanoma – Intraoperative radiation therapy – Intraperitoneal – Intraperitoneal chemotherapy – Intraperitoneal hyperthermic chemoperfusion – Intraperitoneal infusion – Intraperitoneal radiation therapy – Intrapleural – Intrathecal – Intrathecal chemotherapy – Intratumoral (within a tumour) – Intravenous pyelogram – Intravenous pyelography – Intraventricular infusion – Intravesical – Invasive cancer – Invasive cervical cancer – Inverted papilloma – Investigational – Inviable – Iodine I 131 tositumomab – Iododoxorubicin – Ionomycin – IORT – IRB – Irinotecan – Irofulven – Irradiated – Irradiation – Irreversible toxicity – Iseganan hydrochloride – ISIS 2503 – ISIS 3521 – ISIS 5132 – Islet cell – Islet cell cancer – Islet of Langerhans cell – Isoflavone – Isointense – Isolated hepatic perfusion – Isolated limb perfusion – Isolated lung perfusion – Isotretinoin – Itraconazole – IU – IV – IVP – Ixabepilone

== J ==
J-107088 – J-pouch coloanal anastomosis – Jaundice – Jewett staging system – JM 216 – Junctional nevus – Juvenile myelomonocytic leukemia

== K ==
Kaposi's sarcoma – Karenitecin – Karnofsky performance status – Keloid – Keratan sulfate – Keratinocyte growth factor – Keratoacanthoma – Ketoconazole – Ketorolac – Keyhole limpet hemocyanin – KGF – Killer cell – Kinaret – Klatskin tumor – Klebsiella – Klinefelter syndrome – KOS-862 – KPS – Kretek – KRN5500 – KRN7000 – Krukenberg tumor – KW2189

== L ==
L-377,202 – L-778,123 – L-carnitine (see Carnitine) – Laboratory study – Laboratory test – Lacrimal gland – Lactate dehydrogenase – Lactic acid dehydrogenase – LAK cell – Lamina propria – Lamivudine – Lamotrigine – Laparoscope – Laparoscopic prostatectomy – Laparoscopic-assisted colectomy – Laparoscopy – Laparotomy – Lappa – Large cell carcinoma – Large granular lymphocyte – Laryngectomy – Laser surgery – Laser therapy – LCIS – LDH – Lectin – Leflunomide – Leiomyoma – Leiomyosarcoma – Lentinan – Lepirudin – Leptomeningeal – Leptomeningeal cancer – Leptomeningeal metastases – Leridistim – Lerisetron – Leser-Trélat – Letrozole – Leucovorin – Leukapheresis – Leukemia – Leukocyte – Leukopenia – Leukoplakia – Leuprorelin – Leuvectin – Levamisole – Levocarnitine – Levofloxacin – LGD1069 – LH-RH – Lhermitte's sign – Li-Fraumeni syndrome – Liarozole – Ligature (medicine) / ligation – Light-emitting diode therapy – Lignan – Limb perfusion – Limited-stage small cell lung cancer – Linac – Liothyronine sodium – Lipophilic – Liposarcoma – Liposomal – Lisofylline – Liver cancer – Liver metastases – Liver scan – LMB-1 immunotoxin – LMB-2 immunotoxin – LMB-7 immunotoxin – LMB-9 immunotoxin – Lobaplatin – Lobectomy – Lobradimil – Lobular carcinoma in situ – Lobule – Local cancer – Local therapy – Localized gallbladder cancer – Locally advanced cancer – Lometrexol – Lomustine – Lonafarnib – Loop electrosurgical excision procedure – Loop excision – Loperamide hydrochloride – Losoxantrone – Low-grade lymphoma – Lower GI series – LU 79553 – LU-103793 – Lubricant – Lumbar puncture – Lumpectomy – Lung metastases – Lurtotecan – Luteinizing hormone-releasing hormone – Luteinizing hormone-releasing hormone agonist – Lutetium texaphyrin – LY231514 – LY293111 – LY317615 – LY335979 – LY353381 hydrochloride – Lycopene – Lymph gland – Lymph node – Lymph node dissection – Lymph node drainage – Lymph node mapping – Lymph vessel – Lymphadenectomy – Lymphadenopathy – Lymphangiogram – Lymphangiography – Lymphangiosarcoma – Lymphatic fluid – Lymphatic mapping – Lymphatic system – Lymphatic vessel – Lymphedema – Lymphoblast – Lymphocyte – Lymphocytic – Lymphocytic leukemia – Lymphoepithelioma – Lymphography – Lymphoid – Lymphokine-activated killer cell – Lymphoma – Lymphomatoid granulomatosis – Lymphoproliferative disorder – Lymphosarcoma – Lymphoscintigraphy – Lynch syndrome – Lysis – Lysosome – Lytic – Lytic lesion

== M ==
M protein – Macroglobulinemia – Macrophage – Mafosfamide – MAGE-3 – Magnetic resonance imaging – Magnetic resonance perfusion imaging – Magnetic resonance spectroscopic imaging – Magnetic-targeted carrier – Maintenance therapy – Malabsorption syndrome – Malignancy – Malignant – Malignant ascites – Malignant fibrous cytoma – Malignant fibrous histiocytoma – Malignant meningioma – Malignant mesothelioma – Malignant mixed Müllerian tumor – Malignant peripheral nerve sheath tumor – Malondialdehyde – MALT lymphoma – Mammary – Mammogram – Mammography – Mammotome – Mantle field – Marimastat – Mast cell – Mastectomy – Mastocytoma – Matrix metalloproteinase – MDL 101,731 – MDX-060 – Mean survival time – Measurable disease – Mechlorethamine – MEDI-507 – Medial supraclavicular lymph node – Median survival time – Mediastinal pleura – Mediastinoscopy – Mediastinum – Medical castration – Medical oncologist – Medroxyprogesterone – Medullary breast carcinoma – Medullary thyroid cancer – Medulloblastoma – Mega-voltage linear accelerator – Megestrol – Meiosis – Melanocyte – Melanoma – Melanoma vaccine – Melphalan – MEN-10755 – MEN1 syndrome – Meningeal – Meningeal metastases – Meningioma – Menopausal hormone therapy – Mercaptopurine – Mercury (element) – Merkel cell cancer – Mesenchymal – Mesenteric membrane – Mesna – Mesonephroma – Mesothelioma – Metaplasia – Metaplastic carcinoma – Metastasectomy – Metastasis – Metastasize – Metastatic – Metastatic cancer – Metasynchronous – Meteorism – Methotrexate – Methoxsalen – Methoxy polyethylene glycol-epoetin beta – Methyl-5-aminolevulinate – Methylphenidate – Methylprednisolone – Metoclopramide – Metronidazole – Metronomic therapy – Mexican valerian – MG98 – Microcalcification – Micrometastases – Micromolar – Microsatellite (genetics) – Microsatellite instability – Microstaging – Microwave therapy – Microwave thermotherapy – Mifepristone – Miraluma test – Misoprostol – Mistletoe lectin – Mitochondria – Mitolactol – Mitomycin – Mitosis – Mitotane – Mitotic activity – Mitotic index – Mitotic inhibitor – Mitoxantrone – Mivobulin isethionate – Mixed glioma – MLN2704 – Modafinil – Modality – Modified radical mastectomy – Mohs surgery – Molar pregnancy – Molecular risk assessment – Molecularly targeted therapy – Monoclonal antibody – Monoclonal antibody 3F8 – Monocyte – Montanide ISA-51 – Morinda citrifolia – Morphology (biology) – Motexafin gadolinium – Moxifloxacin – MPNST – MRI – MRSI – MS 209 – MS-275 – Mucinous carcinoma – Mucosa-associated lymphoid tissue lymphoma – MuJ591 monoclonal antibody – Mullerian tumor / Müllerian tumor – Multicenter study – Multicentric breast cancer – Multidrug resistance – Multidrug resistance inhibition – Multifocal breast cancer – Multimodality treatment – Multiple endocrine adenomatosis – Multiple endocrine neoplasia syndrome – Multiple endocrine neoplasia type 1 syndrome – Multiple myeloma – Multiple sclerosis – Multiplicity (oncology) – Muromonab-CD3 monoclonal antibody – Musculoskeletal – Mycophenolate mofetil – Mycosis fungoides – Mycostatin – Myelin – Myeloablation – Myelodysplasia – Myelodysplastic syndrome – Myelofibrosis – Myelogenous – Myelogram – Myeloid – Myeloma – Myeloproliferative disorder – Myelosclerosis with myeloid metaplasia – Myelosuppression – Myelosuppressive therapy – Myometrium

== N ==
N-acetylcysteine – N-acetyldinaline – N-butyl-N-(4-hydroxybutyl) nitrosamine – Naloxone – National Cancer Institute – National Institutes of Health – Natural killer cell – NB1011 – NBI-3001 – NCI – Nebulizer – Neck dissection – Needle-localized biopsy – Needle biopsy – Negative axillary lymph node – Negative test result – Nelarabine – Nelfinavir mesylate – Neoadjuvant therapy – Neoplasia – Neoplasm – Nephrotomogram – Nephrotoxic – Nephroureterectomy – Nerve-sparing radical prostatectomy – Nerve-sparing surgery – Nerve block – Nerve grafting – Neuro-oncologist – Neurobehavioral – Neuroblastoma – Neuroectodermal tumor – Neuroendocrine – Neuroendocrine tumor – Neuroepithelial – Neurofibroma – Neurofibromatosis type I – Neurofibromatosis type 2 – Neuroma – Neuron – Neuropathologist – Neuropathy – Neuropeptide – Neuroradiologist – Neurotoxicity – Neurotoxin – Neurotropism – Neutropenia – Neutrophil – Nevus – NF1 – NG-monomethyl-L-arginine – Niacinamide – Nicotinamide – NIH – Nilutamide – Nimodipine – Nipple discharge – Nitrocamptothecin – Nitrosourea – NK cell – NMRI – Node-negative – Node-positive – Nodular parenchyma – Nolatrexed – Non-Hodgkin's lymphoma – Non-small cell lung cancer (NSCLC) – Nonconsecutive case series – Noncontiguous lymphoma – Nonhematologic cancer – Noni – Nonlytic – Nonmalignant – Nonmalignant hematologic disorder – Nonmelanoma skin cancer – Nonmelanomatous – Nonmetastatic – Nonopioid – Nonprescription – Nonrandomized clinical trial – Nonseminoma – Nonspecific immune cell – Nonsteroidal anti-inflammatory drug – Nonsteroidal aromatase inhibitor – Novobiocin – NPO – NR-LU-10 antigen – NSAID – Nuclear magnetic resonance imaging – Nuclear medicine scan – Nutraceutical – Nystatin

== O ==
O(6)-benzylguanine – Oat cell cancer – Objective improvement – Objective response – Oblimersen – Obtundation – Occult stage non-small cell lung cancer – Octreotide – Ocular melanoma – Ofloxacin – OGX-011 – Oligoastrocytoma – Oligodendroglial tumor – Oligodendroglioma – Oltipraz – Omega-3 fatty acid – Omentectomy – Omentum – Omeprazole – Ommaya reservoir – Oncogene – Oncologist – Oncology – Oncology nursing – Oncology pharmacy specialist – Oncolysate – Oncolysis – Oncolytic – Oncolytic virus – Onconase – Ondansetron – ONYX-015 – Oophorectomy – Open biopsy – Open colectomy – Open label study – Opioid – Opportunistic infection – Oral and maxillofacial surgeon – Orchidectomy – Orchiectomy – Oropharynx – OSI-7904L – Osmolality – Osteitis deformans – Osteogenic sarcoma – Osteolytic – Osteoporosis – Osteosarcoma – Ostomy – Ovarian ablation – Ovarian epithelial cancer – Ovarian suppression – Overall Survival (OS) – Overexpress – Overgrowth syndrome – Oxaliplatin – Oxandrolone – OXi-104 – Oxidative metabolism – Oxidative stress

== P ==
P-32 – P-value – P53 gene – Pacific valerian – Paclitaxel – Paclitaxel trevatide – Paget's disease of bone – Paget's disease of the nipple – PALA – Palatine uvula – Palliative care – Palliative therapy – Palmar plantar erythrodysesthesia – Pamidronate – Pancoast's tumor – Pancreatectomy – Pancreatic cancer – Pancreatic duct – Pancreatic enzyme – Pancreatic juice – Pancreatitis – PAP, same as Pap smear – Pap smear – Pap test, same as Pap smear – Papillary serous carcinoma – Papillary thyroid cancer – Papillary tumor – Papilledema – Paracentesis – Parageusia – Paramyxoviridae / paramyxovirus – Paraneoplastic syndrome – Parathyroid gland – Parathyroid hormone – Parenchyma – Paresthesias – Paricalcitol – Parietal pericardium – Parkinson's disease – Parotidectomy – Paroxetine hydrochloride – Partial cystectomy – Partial laryngectomy – Partial mastectomy – Partial nephrectomy – Partial oophorectomy – Partial remission – Partial response – Passive antibody therapy – Paterson–Kelly syndrome – Pathological staging – Patient-controlled analgesia – Patient derived tumor xenografts – PCA – PDQ – Peau d'orange – PEG-interferon alfa-2a – PEG-interferon alfa-2b – PEG-MGDF – Pegaspargase – Pegfilgrastim – PEITC – Peldesine – Pelvic exenteration – Pelvic lymphadenectomy – Pemetrexed disodium – Penclomedine – Penicillamine – Pentetic acid calcium – Pentosan polysulfate – Pentostatin – Pentoxifylline – Peptide – Peptide 946 – Percutaneous ethanol injection – Percutaneous transhepatic biliary drainage – Percutaneous transhepatic cholangiodrainage – Percutaneous transhepatic cholangiography – Perfusion – Perfusion magnetic resonance imaging – Pericardial effusion – Perifosine – Perineal colostomy – Perineal prostatectomy – Peripheral blood lymphocyte therapy – Peripheral neuropathy – Peripheral primitive neuroectodermal tumor – Peripheral stem cell – Peripheral stem cell support – Peripheral stem cell transplantation – Peristalsis – Peritoneal cancer – Peritoneal infusion – Peritoneal perfusion – Pernicious anemia – Pertuzumab – PET scan – Petechiae – Peutz–Jeghers syndrome – Phagocyte – Pharmacokinetics – Phase I trial – Phase I/II trial – Phase II trial – Phase II/III trial – Phase III trial – Phase IV trial – Phenethyl isothiocyanate – Phenoxodiol – Phenylacetate – Phenylbutyrate – Pheochromocytoma – Pheresis – Philadelphia chromosome – Photodynamic therapy – Photofrin – Photopheresis – Photothermal therapy – Phyllodes tumor – Physician Data Query – Phytic acid – Phytoestrogen – Phytosterol – PI-88 – Pilocarpine – Pilocytic – Pineal region tumor – Pineoblastoma – Pineocytoma – Piperacillin/tazobactam – Pirfenidone – Piritrexim – Pixantrone – PJS – PKC412 – Plasmacytic – Plasmacytoma – Plasmapheresis – Plenaxis – Pleomorphism (cytology) / pleomorphic – Pleural effusion – Pleurodesis – Plexiform neurofibroma – Plexopathy – Ploidy – Plummer–Vinson syndrome – Pluripotent – Pluripotent stem cell – PM-81 monoclonal antibody – PNET – Pneumonectomy – PNU 166148 – PNU-93914 – Polifeprosan 20 carmustine implant – Poly-ICLC – Polyglutamate camptothecin – Polyglutamate paclitaxel – Polymerase chain reaction – Polymorphism (biology) – Polyneuritis – Polyp (medicine) – Polypectomy – Polyphenol – Polyphenon E – Polyposis – Pons – Pons / pontine – Porfimer sodium – Porfiromycin – Port-a-cath – Positive axillary lymph node – Positive test result – Positron emission tomography scan – Postremission therapy – PR+ – PR- – Precancerous – Precancerous dermatitis – Precancerous dermatosis – Precancerous polyps – Predictive factor – Prednisolone – Prednisone – Preleukemia – Premalignant – Pretracheal space – Prevascular space – Preventive mastectomy – Primary central nervous system lymphoma – Primary endpoint – Primary myelofibrosis – Primary peritoneal cancer – Primary tumor – Primitive neuroectodermal tumor – Prinomastat – Pro-oxidant – Probenecid – Procarbazine – Prochlorperazine – Proctoscopy – Proctosigmoidoscopy – Progesterone receptor negative – Progesterone receptor positive – Progesterone receptor test – Progression-free survival (PFS) – Progressive disease – Proliferative index – Prolymphocytic leukemia – Promegapoietin – Promyelocytic leukemia – Prophylactic cranial irradiation – Prophylactic mastectomy – Prophylactic oophorectomy – Prophylactic surgery – Prophylaxis – Prospective cohort study – Prost 30 monoclonal antibody – Prostate-specific antigen – Prostate-specific antigen test – Prostate cancer – Prostatectomy – Prostatic acid phosphatase – Prostatic intraepithelial neoplasia – Prostatitis – Protease inhibitor (pharmacology) – Protein kinase C – Proteoglycan – Proteomic profile – Proteomics – Proton beam radiation therapy – Proton magnetic resonance spectroscopic imaging – PS-341 – PSA – Psammoma body – PSC 833 – Pseudomyxoma peritonei – Psoralen – PTC – PTCD – PTK787/ZK 222584 – Ptosis – Pulmonary sulcus tumor – PV701 – Pyrazine diazohydroxide – Pyrazoloacridine – Pyroxamide

== Q ==
Q10 – QS21 – Quadrantectomy

== R ==
R-flurbiprofen – r-tPA – R101933 – R115777 – Radiation fibrosis – Radiation oncologist – Radiation physicist – Radiation surgery – Radiation therapist – Radiation therapy – Radical cystectomy – Radical lymph node dissection – Radical mastectomy – Radical perineal prostatectomy – Radical prostatectomy – Radical retropubic prostatectomy – Radioactive drug – Radioactive iodine – Radioactive palladium – Radioactive seed – Radiofrequency ablation – Radiographer – Radioimmunoguided surgery – Radioimmunotherapy – Radioisotope – Radiolabeled – Radiologic exam – Radionuclide scanning – Radiopharmaceutical – Radiosensitization – Radiosensitizer – Radiosurgery – Radiotherapy – Raloxifene – Raltitrexed – Randomized clinical trial – Ranpirnase – Rapamycin – Rapid hormone cycling – Rapid-onset opioid – Ras gene – Rasburicase – Rattlesnake root – Ravuconazole – Rebeccamycin – Recombinant tissue plasminogen activator – Reconstructive surgeon – Reconstructive surgery – Recurrent cancer – Red blood cell – Reed–Sternberg cell – Reflux – Refractory cancer – Regional cancer – Regional chemotherapy – Regional enteritis – Regional lymph node – Regional lymph node dissection – Rehabilitation specialist – Relative survival rate – Relaxation technique – Remission induction therapy – Remote brachytherapy – Renal cell carcinoma / renal cell cancer – Renal collecting tubule – Renal glomerulus – Renal tubular acidosis – Retinoblastoma – Retinoid – Retinol – Retinyl palmitate – Retroperitoneal – Retropubic prostatectomy – Retrospective cohort study – Retrospective study – Retroviral vector – Retrovirus – RevM10 gene – Rhabdoid tumor – Rhabdomyosarcoma – Rhizoxin – Ribavirin – Ribonucleotide reductase inhibitor – Rifampin – Risedronate – Ritonavir – Rituximab – RK-0202 – RMP-7 – RNA – Ro 31-7453 – Ro 50-3821 – Rofecoxib – Rosiglitazone – Rous sarcoma virus – RPI.4610 – RPR 109881A – RSR13 – RSV

== S ==
S-1 – Scutellaria barbata – S-phase fraction – Safingol – Salpingo-oophorectomy – Salvage therapy – Samarium 153 – Saponin – Saquinavir mesylate – SarCNU – Sarcoma – Sarcosinamide nitrosourea – Sargramostim – Satraplatin – SC-70935 – SCH 54031 – SCH 66336 – SCH-58500 – Schiller test – Schwann cell – Schwannoma – Scintimammography – Scleroderma – Screening mammogram – SDX-102 – SDX-105 – Second-line therapy – Second-look surgery – Second primary cancer – Secondary cancer – Sedoxantrone trihydrochloride – Segmental cystectomy – Segmental mastectomy – Selective estrogen receptor modulator – Selective serotonin reuptake inhibitor – Sella turcica – Semaxanib – Seminal vesicle biopsy – Seminoma – Semiparasitic – Semustine – Senile keratosis – Sentinel lymph node – Sentinel lymph node biopsy – Sentinel lymph node mapping – Seocalcitol – SERM – Serotonin – Sertraline – Serum albumin – Serum glutamate pyruvate transaminase – Serum glutamic oxaloacetic transaminase – Serum tumor marker test – Sesquiterpene lactone – Sestamibi breast imaging – Severe myelosuppression – Sézary syndrome – SGN-00101 – SGN-15 – SGOT – SGPT – Sham therapy – Shave biopsy – Sho-saiko-to – Sialic acid – Sialyl Tn-KLH – Side-to-end coloanal anastomosis – Sideropenic dysphagia – Sigmoidoscope – Sigmoidoscopy – Signal transduction inhibitor – Signet ring cell carcinoma – SIL – Sildenafil – Silybum marianum – Silymarin – Simple mastectomy – Simple nephrectomy – Single-blind study – Single-photon emission computed tomography – Siplizumab – Sirolimus – Small cell lung cancer – Small intestine – Smoldering leukemia – Smoldering myeloma – SMT-487 – SnET2 – SNX 111 – Soblidotin – Sodium borocaptate – Sodium salicylate – Sodium sulfite – Sodium thiosulfate – Soft tissue sarcoma – Solar keratosis – Solid tumor – Somatic cell – Somatic mutation – Somnolence syndrome – Sonogram – Sorivudine – Specific immune cell – Specific-pathogen-free – SPECT – SPF – Spiculated mass – Spindle cell cancer – Spindle cell sarcoma – Spiral CT scan – Splenomegaly – Sputum cytology – Squalamine lactate – Squamous cell – Squamous cell carcinoma – Squamous intraepithelial lesion – SR-29142 – SR-45023A – SR49059 – SSRI – Staging – Staurosporine – Stavudine – Stellate veins – Stem cell – Stem cell factor – Stem cell transplantation – Stent – Stereotactic biopsy – Stereotactic body radiation therapy – Stereotactic external-beam radiation – Stereotactic injection – Stereotactic radiation therapy – Stereotactic radiosurgery – Stereotaxic radiosurgery – Stereotaxis (disambiguation) – Steroid therapy – STI481 – STI571 – Stoma – Stomatitis – Streptavidin – Streptozocin – Stromagen – Stromal tumor – Strontium-89 – Sturge–Weber syndrome – SU011248 – SU101 – SU5416 – SU6668 – Subcutaneous port – Subependymal – Suberoylanilide hydroxamic acid – Subglottis – Subset analysis – Subtenon – Sucralfate – Sulfonamide (medicine) – Sulindac – Superior vena cava – Superior vena cava syndrome – Supraclavicular lymph node – Supraglottic laryngectomy – Supraglottis – Supratentorial – Suramin – Surgical oncologist – Survival rate – Symptom management – Syncytium – Syngeneic bone marrow transplantation – Syngeneic stem cell transplantation – Synovial membrane – Synovial sarcoma – Synthetic protegrin analog – Synthetic retinoid – Systemic chemotherapy – Systemic disease – Systemic lupus erythematosus – Systemic therapy

== T ==
T cell – T-3 – T-cell depletion – T-cell lymphoma – T138067 – T4N5 liposomal lotion – T900607 – TAC-101 – Tacrolimus – TAG-72 antigen – Talampanel – Talaporfin sodium – Tamoxifen – Tariquidar – Taurolidine – Taxane – Technetium tc 99m dextran – Technetium tc 99m sulfur colloid – Tegafur – Teicoplanin – Telangiectasia – Temoporfin – Temozolomide – Teniposide – TENS – Teratoma – Terminal disease – Tetanus toxoid – Tetrahydrouridine – TG4010 – Theophylline – Thermal ablation – Thermography – Thiotepa – Third-line therapy – Thoracentesis – Thoracoscopy – Thoracotomy – Thrombocyte – Thrombocytopenia – Thrombohemorrhagic event – Thrombophlebitis – Thrombopoietin – Thymidine – Thymidylate synthase inhibitor – Thymoma – Thyrogen – Thyroglobulin – Thyroid-stimulating hormone – Thyroid follicular cell – Thyroid hormone – Thyroidectomy – Thyrotropin alfa – Tiazofurin – Time to progression – Tin ethyl etiopurpurin – Tin Sn 117m DTPA – Tinidazole – Tioguanine – Tipifarnib – Tirapazamine – Tissue plasminogen activator – TLK286 – TM – TNF – TNFerade – TNM staging system – TNP-470 – Tocladesine – Tomography – Topical chemotherapy – Topoisomerase inhibitor – Topotecan – Toremifene – Tositumomab – Total-body irradiation – Total androgen blockade – Total estrogen blockade – Total nodal irradiation – Total parenteral nutrition – TP-38 immunotoxin – tPA – TPA – Trabecular cancer – Trabecular meshwork – Transabdominal ultrasound – Transcutaneous electric nerve stimulation – Transdermal – Transferrin-CRM107 – Transitional cell – Transitional cell carcinoma – Transperineal biopsy – Transplacental carcinogenesis – Transrectal biopsy – Transrectal ultrasound – Transurethral biopsy – Transurethral needle ablation – Transurethral resection – Transurethral resection of the prostate – Transvaginal ultrasound – Trastuzumab – Traumeel S – Treosulfan – Tretinoin – Triacetyluridine – Triamcinolone – Triapine – Tributyrin – Trichothiodystrophy – Triiodothyronine – Trimethoprim-sulfamethoxazole – Trimetrexate glucuronate – Triptorelin – Troglitazone – Tropisetron – Troxacitabine – TRUS – Tuberous sclerosis – Tubulovillous adenoma – Tumor-derived – Tumor-specific antigen – Tumor – Tumor antigen vaccine – Tumor board review – Tumor burden – Tumor debulking – Tumor infiltrating lymphocyte – Tumor load – Tumor marker – Tumor model – Tumor necrosis factor superfamily – Tumor suppressor gene – TUR – TURP – TVS – Tympany – Type I and type II errors – Tyrosinase peptide – Tyrosine kinase inhibitor – TZT-1027

== U ==
Ubiquinone – UCN-01 – UGT1A1 – Ultrasonogram – Ultrasonography – ultrasound-guided biopsy—see Ultrasound and Biopsy – ultraviolet radiation therapy—see Ultraviolet radiation and Radiation therapy – uncontrolled study—see Clinical trial – unconventional cancer treatments—see Experimental cancer treatment – undifferentiated—see Cellular differentiation – unilateral salpingo-oophorectomy—see Oophorectomy – unresectable—see Segmental resection – unresectable gallbladder cancer—see Gallbladder cancer – unsealed internal radiation therapy—see Radiation therapy – Upper GI series – Urachus – Uracil – urea nitrogen—see Blood urea nitrogen – Ureteroscopy – urine cytology—see Urine – Urokinase – urologic oncologist—see Urology and Oncologist – Urothelium – Ursodiol – UV radiation – UVA radiation – UVB radiation – Uvula

== V ==
Vaccine adjuvant – Vaccine therapy – Vaccinia CEA vaccine – Vaginal cancer – Vaginal melanoma – Vaginal tumors – Valacyclovir – Valdecoxib – Valerian (herb) – Valeriana officinalis – Valerianae radix – Valganciclovir – Valproic acid – Vancomycin – Vapreotide – Varicose veins – Vascular endothelial growth factor – VEGF – VEGF Trap – Venlafaxine – Video-assisted resection – Video-assisted surgery – Villous adenoma – Villus – Vinblastine – Vinca alkaloid – Vincristine – Vindesine – Vinorelbine – Viral vector – Virotherapy – Virtual colonoscopy – Virulizin – Virus-neutralizing antibody – Virus replication cycle – Viscotoxins – Visilizumab – Visual pathway glioma – VNP20009 – VNP40101M – Von Hippel–Lindau disease – Voriconazole – Vorozole – Vulvar cancer – VX 853 – VX-710

== W ==
Waldenström macroglobulinemia – Warfarin – Wedge resection – Wermer's syndrome – Whipple procedure – White blood cell – Whitmore-Jewett staging system – Whole cell vaccine – Wilms' tumor – Wobe-Mugos E

== X ==
X-ray – X-ray therapy – Xenograft – Xeroderma pigmentosum – Xerogram – Xerostomia – XK469 – XR9576

== Y ==
YM598 – Yttrium Y 90 ibritumomab tiuxetan – Yttrium Y 90 SMT 487 – Yttrium Y 90-DOTA-tyr3-octreotide

== Z ==
ZD 1839 – ZD0473 – ZD6474 – Ziconotide – Zidovudine – Zileuton – Zoledronate – Zollinger–Ellison syndrome – Zoloft – Zolpidem – Zosuquidar trihydrochloride
