= C9H6N2O3 =

The molecular formula C_{9}H_{6}N_{2}O_{3} (molar mass: 190.16 g/mol, exact mass: 190.0378 u) may refer to:

- 4-Nitroquinoline 1-oxide
- Nitroxoline
