= Apolizumab =

Chemical compound

Monoclonal antibody
- Type: Whole antibody
- Source: Humanized (from mouse)
- Target: HLA-DR beta

Clinical data
- ATC code: none

Identifiers
- CAS Number: 267227-08-7
- ChemSpider: none
- UNII: G88KCP51RE
- KEGG: D02967

Apolizumab is a humanized monoclonal antibody intended for use in hematologic cancers. Development was abandoned in 2005, because of toxic effects and lack of efficacy in humans. The observed dose limiting toxic effects were aseptic meningitis and hemolytic uremia.
