= Autologous lymphocyte =

Cell class

In transplantation, autologous lymphocytes refers to a person's own white blood cells. Lymphocytes have a number of roles in the immune system, including the production of antibodies and other substances that fight infections and other diseases.
