= Triapine =

Identifiers
- IUPAC name: [(E)-(3-aminopyridin-2-yl)methylideneamino]thiourea
- CAS Number: 143621-35-6
- PubChem CID: 9571836
- DrugBank: DB11940
- ChemSpider: 7846300
- UNII: U4XIL4091C
- ChEBI: CHEBI:231347
- ChEMBL: ChEMBL231616
- CompTox Dashboard (EPA): DTXSID90893923
- ECHA InfoCard: 100.229.703

Chemical and physical data
- Formula: C_{7}H_{9}N_{5}S
- Molar mass: 195.24 g·mol^{−1}
- 3D model (JSmol): Interactive image
- SMILES: C1=CC(=C(N=C1)/C=N/NC(=S)N)N
- InChI: InChI=InChI=1S/C7H9N5S/c8-5-2-1-3-10-6(5)4-11-12-7(9)13/h1-4H,8H2,(H3,9,12,13)/b11-4+; Key:XMYKNCNAZKMVQN-NYYWCZLTSA-N

Triapine (also known as 3-aminopyridine-2-carboxaldehyde thiosemicarbazone or 3-AP) is an investigational drug that is being evaluated for the treatment of cancer. It is a thiosemicarbazone derivative of 3-aminopyridine-2-carboxaldehyde. It presents an N-N-S array of donor sites that strongly bind iron, robbing iron-containing enzymes of their prosthetic group.

It belongs to the family of drugs called ribonucleotide reductase inhibitors.

== Pharmacology ==
3AP is a potent inhibitor of ribonucleotide reductase, the rate determining enzyme in the supply of deoxynucleotides (DNA building blocks) for DNA synthesis. DNA synthesis is required for cellular proliferation and DNA repair. It is a very strong iron chelator and in the body it is likely that the iron chelate is the active species that quenches the active site tyrosyl radical required by ribonucleotide reductase for its enzymatic activity. The 3AP iron chelate is redox active and there have been several reports in the literature ascribing this property to some of the biological activities of 3AP. 3AP was chosen, based on the results of studying and the screening these products, as the candidate inhibitor most likely to express activity in the setting of human neoplastic disease. Vion Pharmaceuticals has also filed several use patents concerning the antiviral and antifungal activity of 3AP.

It has also been reported to have neuroprotective properties.

== Development ==
3AP was initially developed by Vion Pharmaceuticals until the company declared bankruptcy in December 2009. Nanotherapeutics, Inc. acquired the product from bankruptcy in 2010 and supported trials at NCI until 2018 when the product was transferred to Nanoshift, LLC. Nanoshift LLC and Nanopharmaceutics, Inc. continue to support clinical studies with the NCI.
