= Coloanal anastomosis =

Surgical procedure

- Specialty: Gastroenterologist

Coloanal anastomosis (also known as coloanal pull-through) is a surgical procedure in which the colon is attached to the anus after the rectum has been removed.
