= Cerebrospinal fluid diversion =

- Specialty: Neurology

Cerebrospinal fluid diversion is a procedure that is used to drain fluid from the brain and spinal cord. A shunt is placed in a ventricle of the brain and threaded under the skin to another part of the body, usually the abdomen. It is used to treat hydrocephalus and idiopathic intracranial hypertension.
