= Efaproxiral =

Chemical compound

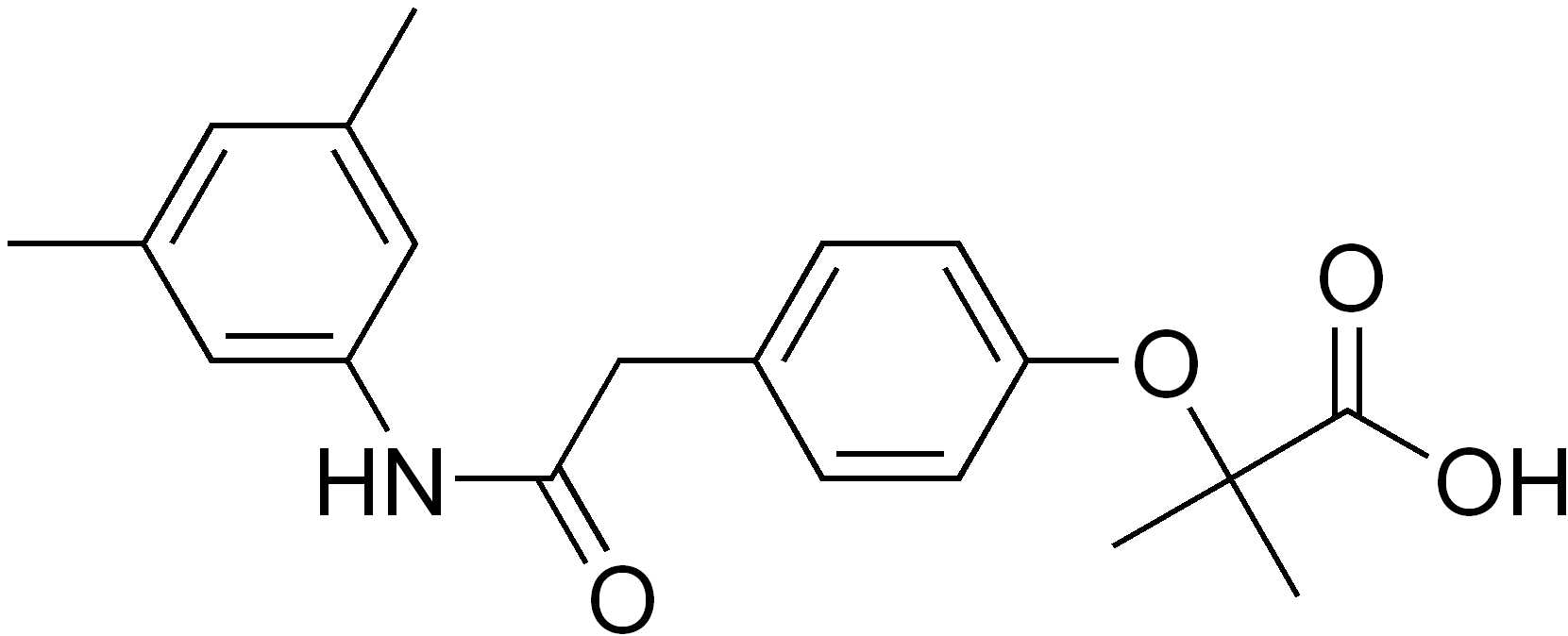

Clinical data
- ATC code: L01XD06 (WHO)

Pharmacokinetic data
- Elimination half-life: 1 hr

Identifiers
- IUPAC name: 2-[4-[2-[(3,5-dimethylphenyl)amino]-2-oxoethyl]phenoxy]-2-methylpropanoic acid
- CAS Number: 131179-95-8
- PubChem CID: 122335
- ChemSpider: 109085
- UNII: J81E81G364
- ChEMBL: ChEMBL18901
- CompTox Dashboard (EPA): DTXSID40156934

Chemical and physical data
- Formula: C_{20}H_{23}NO_{4}
- Molar mass: 341.407 g·mol^{−1}
- 3D model (JSmol): Interactive image
- SMILES: Cc1cc(cc(c1)NC(=O)Cc2ccc(cc2)OC(C)(C)C(=O)O)C
- InChI: InChI=1S/C20H23NO4/c1-13-9-14(2)11-16(10-13)21-18(22)12-15-5-7-17(8-6-15)25-20(3,4)19(23)24/h5-11H,12H2,1-4H3,(H,21,22)(H,23,24); Key:BNFRJXLZYUTIII-UHFFFAOYSA-N

Efaproxiral (INN) is an analogue of bezafibrate [a lipid-lowering agent], developed for the treatment of depression, traumatic brain injury, ischemia, stroke, myocardial infarction, diabetes, hypoxia, sickle cell disease, hypercholesterolemia and as a radio sensitiser.

The chemical is a derivative of propanoic acid. One use for efaproxiral is to increase the efficacy of certain chemotherapy drugs which have reduced efficacy against hypoxic tumours, and can thus be made more effective by increased offloading of oxygen into the tumour tissues. No benefit was seen for efaproxiral in phase III clinical trials. The increased oxygenation of tissues could theoretically also produce enhanced exercise capacity in feline, rat and canine models for approximately 100 min. immediately after a high dosage 45 min. intravenous infusion.

This has led World Anti-Doping Agency to categorise efaproxiral under a prohibited method to artificially enhance the uptake, transport or delivery of oxygen. There is no existing evidence that efaproxiral can effectively enhance performance in humans. Efaproxiral can be absorbed via transdermal, rectal, inhalation and gastrointestinal routes, though not at plasma concentrations great enough to alter the oxygen-haemoglobin dissociation curve.

Efaproxiral is explicitly excluded from the 2012 World Anti-Doping Agency list of Prohibited Substances and is explicitly included in the Prohibited Methods section M1 as a forbidden procedure to alter the oxygen-haemoglobin dissociation curve in order to allosterically modify haemoglobin.
