= Fatty-replaced breast tissue =

Fatty-replaced breast tissue is a term used in mammography that refers to the replacement of breast tissue with fatty tissue. This commonly occurs as a person ages.
