= Tumor board review =

Case conference to plan cancer patient treatment

Tumor board review is conducted when teams of expert physicians meet to review and discuss complex patients with a diagnosis of cancer. It is a treatment planning approach in which a number of doctors who are experts in different medical specialties review and discuss the medical condition and treatment options of a patient. In cancer treatment, a tumor board review may include that of a medical oncologist (who provides cancer treatment with drugs), a surgical oncologist (who provides cancer treatment with surgery), and a radiation oncologist (who provides cancer treatment with radiation).
