= Stromagen =

Stromagen is a product that is made of stem cells taken from a patient's bone marrow and grown in the laboratory. After a patient's bone marrow is destroyed by treatment with whole body irradiation or chemotherapy, these cells are injected back into the patient to help rebuild bone marrow. Stromagen has been studied in the prevention of graft-versus-host disease during stem cell transplant in patients receiving treatment for cancer. Stromagen is used in cellular therapy. Also called autologous expanded mesenchymal stem cells OTI-010. Peripheral stem cell transplantation may allow doctors to give higher doses of chemotherapy and kill more tumor cells. It is not yet known whether Stromagen improves the success of stem cell transplantation in women with breast cancer.
