= Malignant meningioma =

Malignant meningioma is a rare, fast-growing tumor that forms in one of the inner layers of the meninges (thin layers of tissue that cover and protect the brain and spinal cord). Malignant meningioma often spreads to other areas of the body.

The World Health Organization classification system defines both grade II and grade III meningiomas as malignant. Historically, histological subtypes have also been used in classification including:

- clear cell (WHO grade II),
- chordoid (WHO grade II),
- rhabdoid (WHO grade III), and
- papillary (WHO grade III)

Benign or low grade meningiomas (WHO grade I) include meningothelial, fibrous, transitional, psammomatous, angiomatous, microcystic, secretory, lymphoplasmacyte-rich, and metaplastic.
