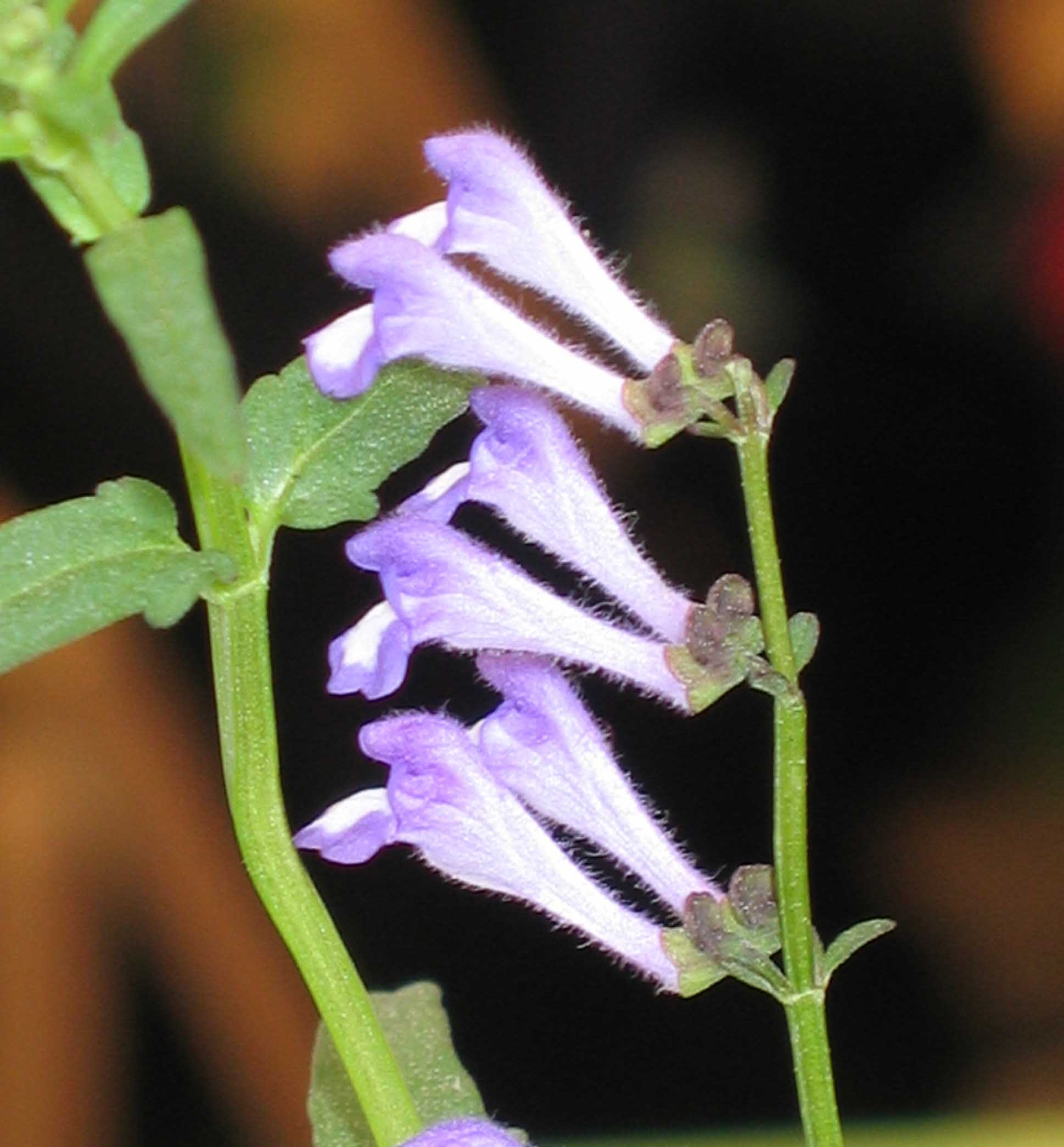
- At Hong Kong Flower Show

Scientific classification
- Kingdom: Plantae
- Clade: Tracheophytes
- Clade: Angiosperms
- Clade: Eudicots
- Clade: Asterids
- Order: Lamiales
- Family: Lamiaceae
- Genus: Scutellaria
- Species: S. barbata

Binomial name
- Scutellaria barbata D.Don.

= Scutellaria barbata =

Species of flowering plant

Scutellaria barbata, the barbed skullcap, is a species of flowering plant in the mint family, Lamiaceae. It is native to Asia.

== Description ==
It is a perennial herb generally reaching up to 35 centimeters tall, sometimes taller. The lightly toothed leaves are somewhat lance-shaped or triangular and up to about 3 centimeters long. The flowers are borne on pedicels that have tiny, sharp bracteoles. The purple-blue, lightly hairy flower corolla is roughly a centimeter long. The plant grows in moist and wet habitats, such as paddy fields. It contains a large amount of terpineol.

== Distribution ==
The herb grows on the flat-lands in South Central China. It is usually harvested at the end of summer.

== Therapeutic usage ==
The herb is used as a medicine to treat cancer. However, there have been multiple reports that patients who were treated with the herb struggled with inflammation and infection.

They are also used to treat hepatitis, appendicitis, pulmonary abscess, and ascites due to cirrhosis.
