= Brostallicin =

Names
- IUPAC name 4-[(2-Bromoacryloyl)amino]-N-{5-[(5-{[5-({2-[(diaminomethylene)amino]ethyl}carbamoyl)-1-methyl-1H-pyrrol-3-yl]carbamoyl}-1-methyl-1H-pyrrol-3-yl)carbamoyl]-1-methyl-1H-pyrrol-3-yl}-1-methyl-1H-pyrrole-2-carboxamide

Identifiers
CAS Number	203258-60-0
3D model (JSmol)	Interactive image
ChEMBL	ChEMBL1189025
ChemSpider	5293605
DrugBank	DB06598
PubChem CID	6918408
UNII	RPC6R41K4I
CompTox Dashboard (EPA)	DTXSID70174222
- InChI: InChI=1S/C30H35BrN12O5/c1-16(31)25(44)36-17-9-22(41(3)12-17)27(46)38-19-11-24(43(5)14-19)29(48)39-20-10-23(42(4)15-20)28(47)37-18-8-21(40(2)13-18)26(45)34-6-7-35-30(32)33/h8-15H,1,6-7H2,2-5H3,(H,34,45)(H,36,44)(H,37,47)(H,38,46)(H,39,48)(H4,32,33,35) Key: RXOVOXFAAGIKDQ-UHFFFAOYSA-N; InChI=1/C30H35BrN12O5/c1-16(31)25(44)36-17-9-22(41(3)12-17)27(46)38-19-11-24(43(5)14-19)29(48)39-20-10-23(42(4)15-20)28(47)37-18-8-21(40(2)13-18)26(45)34-6-7-35-30(32)33/h8-15H,1,6-7H2,2-5H3,(H,34,45)(H,36,44)(H,37,47)(H,38,46)(H,39,48)(H4,32,33,35) Key: RXOVOXFAAGIKDQ-UHFFFAOYAF
- SMILES: CN1C=C(C=C1C(=O)NCCN=C(N)N)NC(=O)C2=CC(=CN2C)NC(=O)C3=CC(=CN3C)NC(=O)C4=CC(=CN4C)NC(=O)C(=C)Br

Properties
Chemical formula	C_{30}H_{35}BrN_{12}O_{5}
Molar mass	723.593 g·mol^{−1}
- Except where otherwise noted, data are given for materials in their standard state (at 25 °C [77 °F], 100 kPa). Infobox references

Brostallicin is a chemical compound being studied in the treatment of cancer. It is an alkylating agent that binds DNA.
