= Positive axillary lymph node =

Lymph node in the armpit to which cancer has spread

A positive axillary lymph node is a lymph node in the area of the armpit (axilla) to which cancer has spread. This spread is determined by surgically removing some of the lymph nodes and examining them under a microscope to see whether cancer cells are present.
