= Conventional treatment =

Therapy that is widely used and accepted by most health professionals

Conventional treatment or Conventional therapy is the therapy that is widely used and accepted by most health professionals. It is different from alternative therapies, which are not as widely used. Examples of conventional treatment: some treatment for cancer include surgery, chemotherapy and radiation therapy.
