= Radioimmunoguided surgery =

Method of locating tumours to enable removal

- Specialty: Oncology

Radioimmunoguided surgery is a procedure that uses radioactive substances to locate tumors so that they can be removed by surgery.
