= Siplizumab =

Monoclonal antibody

Monoclonal antibody
- Type: Whole antibody
- Source: Humanized (from rat)
- Target: CD2

Clinical data
- ATC code: none

Identifiers
- CAS Number: 288392-69-8
- ChemSpider: none
- UNII: KUW1QG1ZM3
- KEGG: D05847

Siplizumab (MEDI-507) is an investigational monoclonal antibody with a human IgG1, kappa directed to CD2. The agent has shown potent immunomodulatory effects, selectively suppressing the function of T and NK cells, and has been tested as a possible treatment for psoriasis and in the prevention of graft-versus-host disease.
