= Autologous tumor cell =

Cancer cell from a patient's own tumor

An autologous tumor cell is a cancer cell from an individual's own tumor.
