= Angiozyme =

Type of drug

Angiozyme is an anti-angiogenic ribozyme. It is largely being studied in the treatment of kidney cancer. It may prevent the growth of blood vessels from surrounding tissue to the tumor, i.e., angiogenesis. It belongs to the families of drugs called VEGF receptor and angiogenesis inhibitors. Preliminary tests have demonstrated that Angiogenesis has no significant side effects. It is also known as RPI.4610.
