= Medial supraclavicular lymph node =

Lymph node above the collar bone

A medial supraclavicular lymph node is a lymph node located above the collar bone and between the center of the body and a line drawn through the nipple to the shoulder.
