= Allovectin-7 =

Substance studied in cancer treatment

Allovectin-7 is a substance that is being studied as a gene therapy agent in the treatment of cancer, such as melanoma. It is a plasmid/lipid complex containing the DNA sequences encoding HLA-B7 and β2 microglobulin - two components of major histocompatibility complex (MHC, class I). It increases the ability of the immune system to recognize cancer cells and kill them.

In 1999, FDA granted Allovectin-7 orphan drug designation for the treatment of invasive and metastatic melanoma.
