= Rapid hormone cycling =

Hormone-production alternating procedure for treating prostate cancer

Rapid hormone cycling is a procedure in which drugs that block the production of male hormones are alternated with male hormones and/or drugs that promote the production of male hormones. This procedure is being studied in the treatment of prostate cancer.
