= Erythroid dysplasia =

- Specialty: Hematology

Erythroid dysplasia is a condition in which immature red blood cells (erythroid cells) in the bone marrow are abnormal in size and/or number. Erythroid dysplasia may be caused by vitamin deficiency or chemotherapy, or it may be a sign of refractory anemia, which is a myelodysplastic syndrome. Also called erythrodysplasia.
