= Anticachexia =

Anticachexia (AN-tee-kuh-KEK-see-uh) is a drug or effect that works against cachexia (loss of body weight and muscle mass).

== See also ==
- Cachexia#Management
