= Alanosine =

Chemical compound

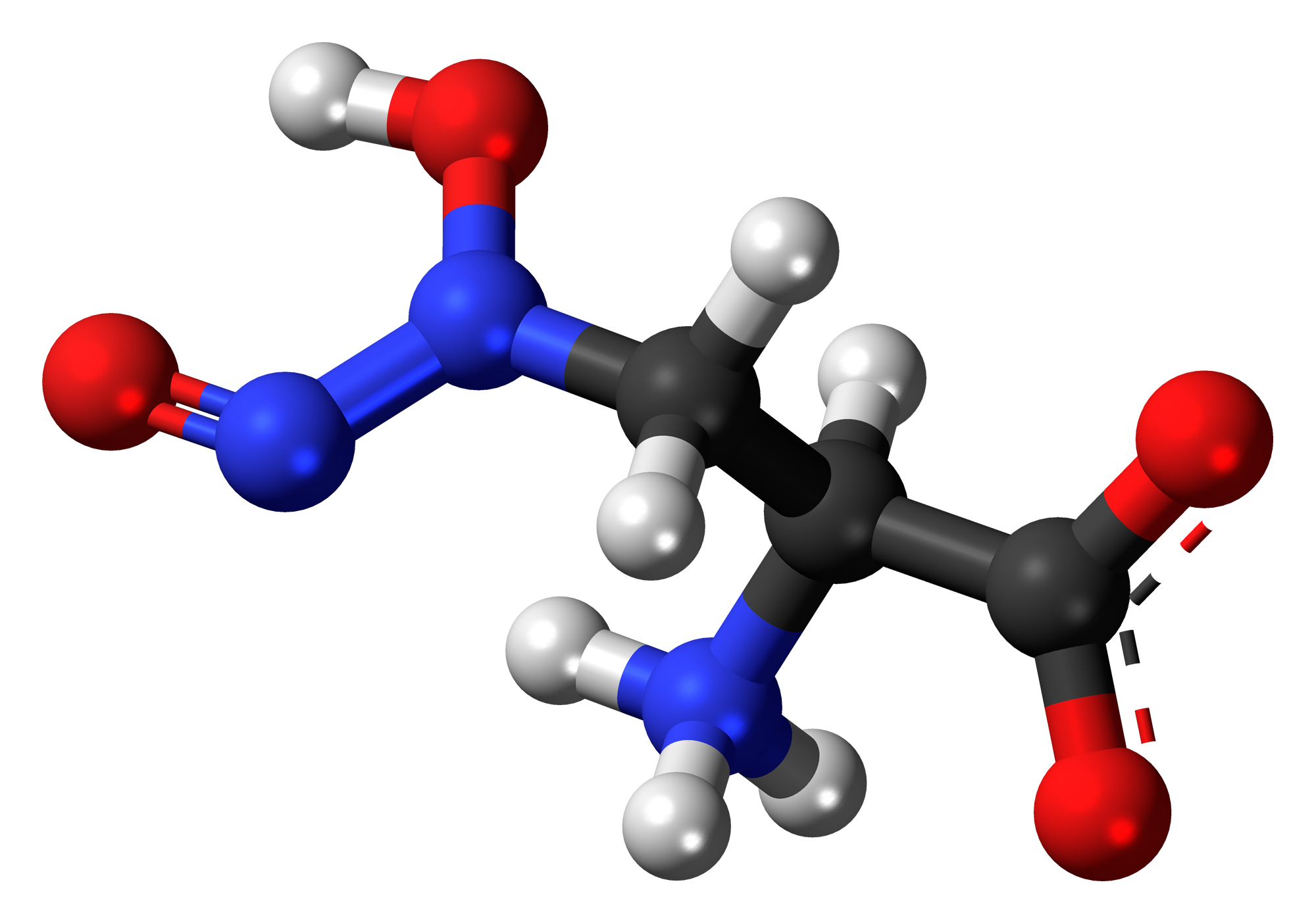

Clinical data
- ATC code: None

Identifiers
- IUPAC name: (S)-2-Amino-3-[hydroxy(nitroso)amino]propanoic acid
- CAS Number: 5854-93-3
- PubChem CID: 22128
- ChemSpider: 20787
- UNII: 2CNI71214Y
- ChEMBL: ChEMBL452715
- CompTox Dashboard (EPA): DTXSID501024175

Chemical and physical data
- Formula: C_{3}H_{7}N_{3}O_{4}
- Molar mass: 149.106 g·mol^{−1}
- 3D model (JSmol): Interactive image
- SMILES: O=C(O)[C@@H](N)CN(O)N=O
- InChI: InChI=1S/C3H7N3O4/c4-2(3(7)8)1-6(10)5-9/h2,10H,1,4H2,(H,7,8)/t2-/m0/s1; Key:MLFKVJCWGUZWNV-REOHCLBHSA-N

Alanosine (also called SDX-102) is a substance that has been studied for the treatment of pancreatic cancer. It is an antimetabolite. It is used as one of a few experimental treatments for patients with deadly pancreatic cancer when the main chemotherapeutic treatment regimen of gemcitabine is no longer useful.
