= Desmoplastic melanoma =

- Other names: Neurotropic melanoma, or Spindled melanoma
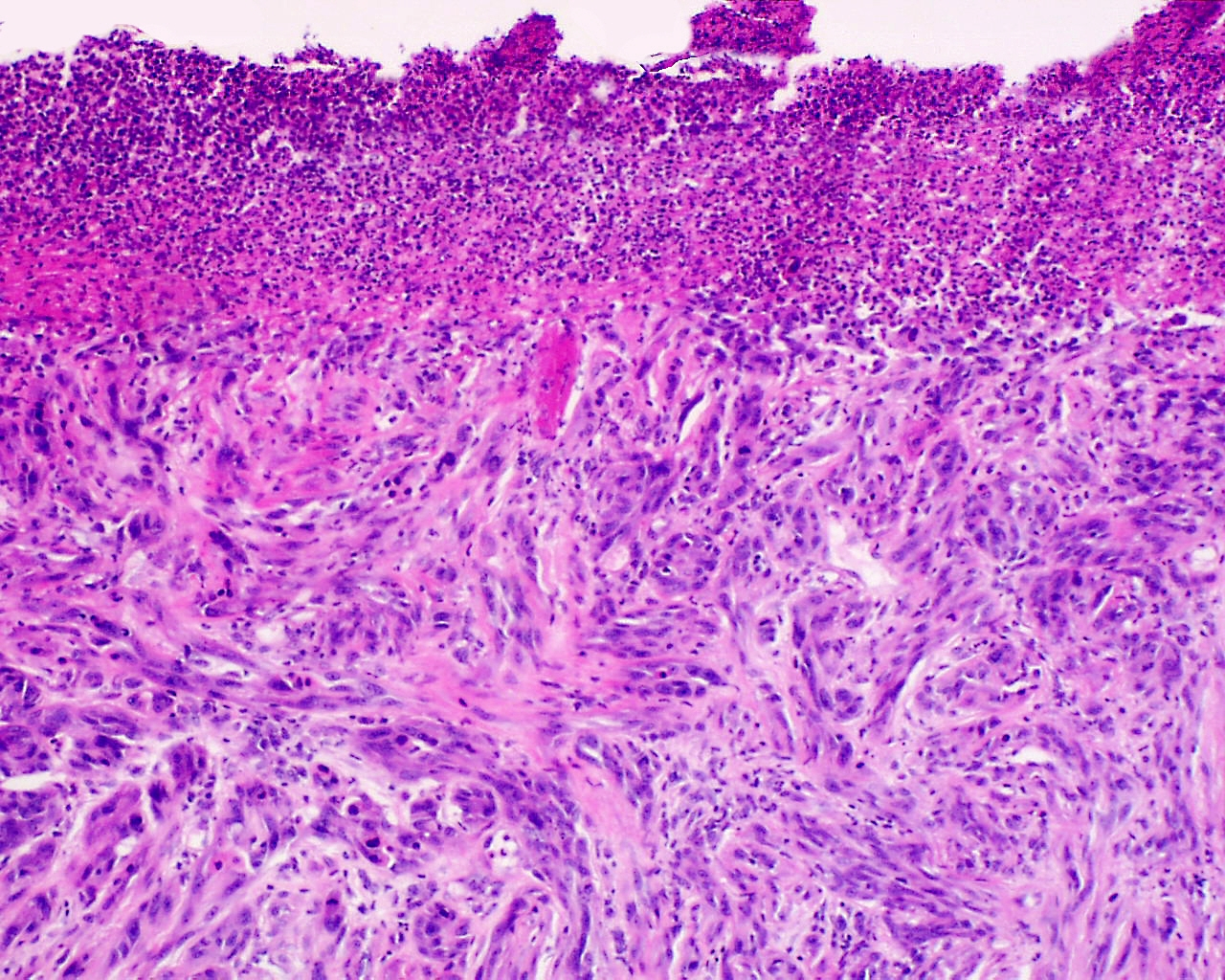
- Desmoplastic melanoma
- Specialty: Dermatology

Desmoplastic melanoma, also known as neurotropic melanoma, or spindled melanoma is a rare cutaneous condition characterized by a deeply infiltrating type of melanoma with an abundance of fibrous matrix. It usually occurs in the head and neck region of older people with sun-damaged skin. Diagnosis can be difficult as it has a similar appearance to sclerosing melanocytic nevi as well as some nonmelanocytic skin lesions such as scars, fibromas, or cysts. Desmoplastic melanomas tend to recur locally, with distant metastasis being less common.

== See also ==
- Melanoma
- List of cutaneous conditions
