= Carcinoembryonic antigen peptide-1 =

Nine amino acid peptide fragment of carcinoembryonic antigen

Carcinoembryonic antigen peptide-1 is a nine amino acid peptide fragment of carcinoembryonic antigen (CEA), a protein that is overexpressed in several cancer cell types, including gastrointestinal, breast, and non-small-cell lung.

Synonyms:

- CAP-1
- Carcinoembryonic Antigen Peptide-1
- Carcinoembryonic Peptide-1
- CEA Peptide 1
- CEA Peptide 9-mer
