= Nodular parenchyma =

Functional unit of a gland or organ

Nodular parenchyma is a small mass of tissue within a gland or organ that carries out the specialized functions of the gland or organ.
