= Embryoma =

Embryooma
- Other names: Embryonal tumor
- Specialty: Oncology

Embryoma is a mass of rapidly growing cells believed to originate in embryonic (fetal) tissue. Embryonal tumors may be benign or malignant, and include neuroblastomas and Wilms tumors. Also called embryoma. Embryomas have been defined as: "Adult neoplasms expressing one or more embryo-exclusive genes."

Embryomas can appear in the lungs.

It is not a precise term, and it is not commonly used in modern medical literature. Embryomas have been defined as: "Adult neoplasms expressing one or more embryo-exclusive genes".
