= Sabarubicin =

Chemical compound

Clinical data
- ATC code: none

Identifiers
- CAS Number: 211100-13-9
- PubChem CID: 151897
- ChemSpider: 133880
- UNII: XS499WOZ93
- ChEMBL: ChEMBL591251
- CompTox Dashboard (EPA): DTXSID30870233

Chemical and physical data
- Formula: C_{32}H_{37}NO_{13}
- Molar mass: 643.642 g·mol^{−1}
- 3D model (JSmol): Interactive image
- SMILES: C[C@H]1[C@H]([C@H](C[C@@H](O1)O[C@@H]2[C@@H](O[C@H](C[C@@H]2O)O[C@H]3C[C@@](Cc4c3c(c5c(c4O)C(=O)c6ccccc6C5=O)O)(C(=O)CO)O)C)N)O
- InChI: InChI=InChI=1S/C32H37NO13/c1-12-26(37)17(33)7-21(43-12)46-31-13(2)44-22(8-18(31)35)45-19-10-32(42,20(36)11-34)9-16-23(19)30(41)25-24(29(16)40)27(38)14-5-3-4-6-15(14)28(25)39/h3-6,12-13,17-19,21-22,26,31,34-35,37,40-42H,7-11,33H2,1-2H3/t12-,13-,17-,18-,19-,21-,22-,26+,31-,32-/m0/s1

Sabarubicin (MEN-10755), a disaccharide analog of doxorubicin, is used for the treatment of small cell lung cancer (SCLC). It has been seen to show superior antitumour efficacy, which is purported to be linked to the activation of p53-independent apoptosis
