= Microstaging =

Method to determine the stage of melanoma and certain squamous cell cancers

Microstaging is a technique used to help determine the stage (extent) of melanoma and certain squamous cell cancers. A sample of skin that contains tumor tissue is examined under a microscope to find out how thick the tumor is and/or how deeply the tumor has grown into the skin or connective tissues.
