= Canfosfamide =

Chemical compound

Clinical data
- Other names: TLK286

Legal status
- Legal status: Investigational

Identifiers
- IUPAC name: (2S)-2-Amino-5-[[(2R)-3-[2-[bis[bis(2-chloroethyl)amino]phosphoryloxy]ethylsulfonyl]-1-[[(R)-carboxy(phenyl)methyl]amino]-1-oxopropan-2-yl]amino]-5-oxopentanoic acid
- CAS Number: 158382-37-7 HCl: 439943-59-6
- PubChem CID: 5312109
- DrugBank: DB04972
- ChemSpider: 4471543
- UNII: 1RS284BFUI
- ChEBI: CHEBI:135883
- ChEMBL: ChEMBL2111086
- CompTox Dashboard (EPA): DTXSID40166412

Chemical and physical data
- Formula: C_{26}H_{40}Cl_{4}N_{5}O_{10}PS
- Molar mass: 787.46 g·mol^{−1}
- 3D model (JSmol): Interactive image
- SMILES: C1=CC=C(C=C1)[C@H](C(=O)O)NC(=O)[C@H](CS(=O)(=O)CCOP(=O)(N(CCCl)CCCl)N(CCCl)CCCl)NC(=O)CC[C@@H](C(=O)O)N
- InChI: InChI=1S/C26H40Cl4N5O10PS/c27-8-12-34(13-9-28)46(42,35(14-10-29)15-11-30)45-16-17-47(43,44)18-21(32-22(36)7-6-20(31)25(38)39)24(37)33-23(26(40)41)19-4-2-1-3-5-19/h1-5,20-21,23H,6-18,31H2,(H,32,36)(H,33,37)(H,38,39)(H,40,41)/t20-,21-,23+/m0/s1; Key:OJLHWPALWODJPQ-QNWVGRARSA-N

Canfosfamide (development code TLK286) an investigational anticancer drug that has been evaluated for its potential efficacy in treating a variety of solid tumors. TLK286 functions as a prodrug activated by the enzyme glutathione S-transferase P1-1 (GST P1-1), which is often overexpressed in cancer cells, leading to selective cytotoxicity towards tumor cells compared to normal cells.

== Mechanism of action ==
Canfosfamide is specifically activated in the presence of elevated GST P1-1, which is commonly found in various cancer types. Upon activation, it is converted into an alkylating agent that induces DNA damage, leading to apoptosis in cancer cells.

== Clinical trials ==
Phase I clinical trials evaluated the safety, tolerability, and pharmacokinetics of canfosfamide. Phase II trials evaluated clinical activity in various tumor types, especially ovarian cancer and non-small cell lung cancer. Phase III trials focused on its efficacy as part of combination therapy, particularly with standard chemotherapeutic agents. However, the trials did not demonstrate significant improvement in overall survival when compared to standard treatments alone.
