= DHA-paclitaxel =

Investigational drug

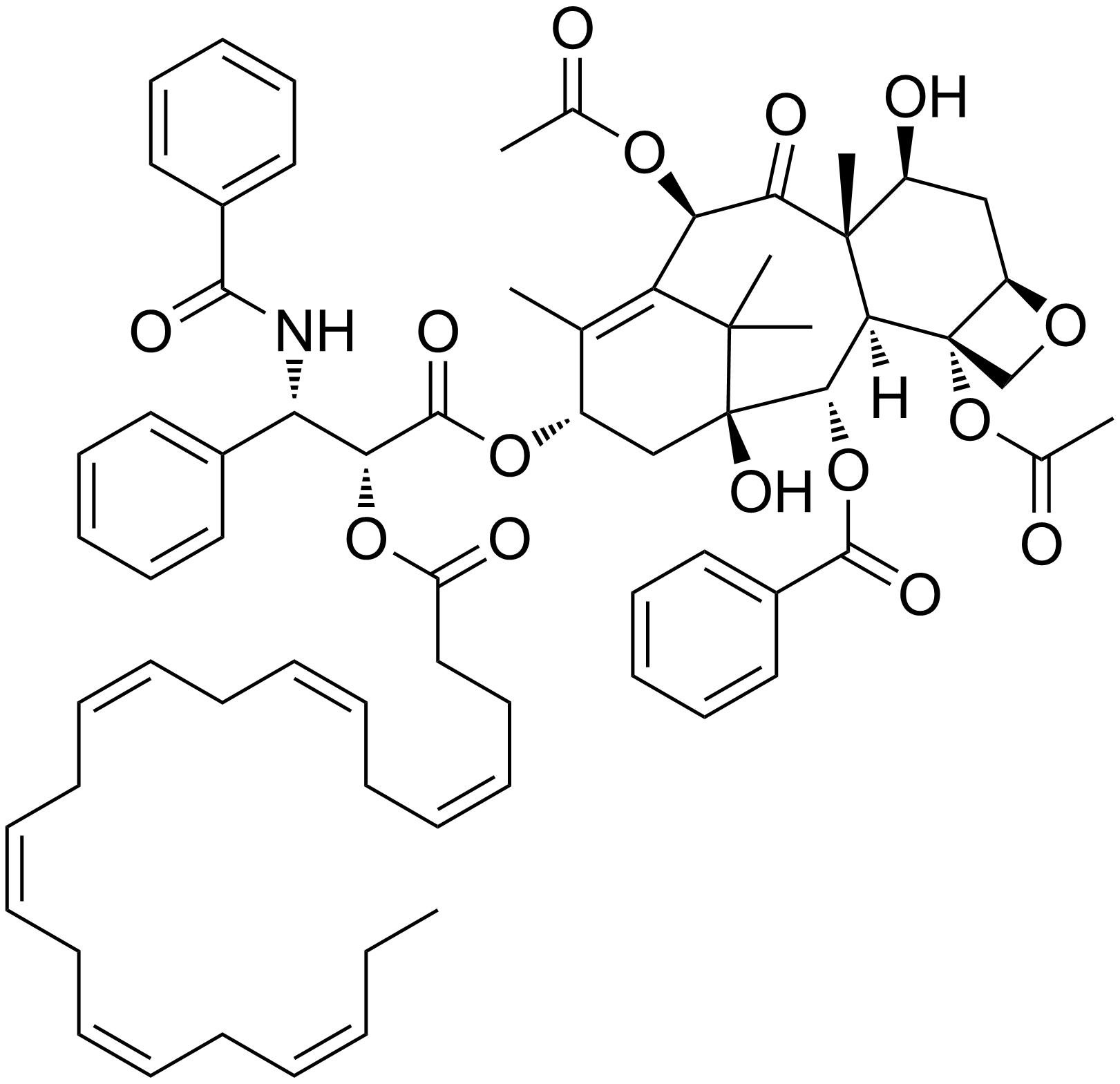

Names
- IUPAC name 1,7β-Dihydroxy-9-oxo-5β,20-epoxytax-11-ene-2α,4α,10β,13α-tetrayl 4,10-diacetate 13-[(2R,3S)-3-benzamido-2-{[(4Z,7Z,10Z,13Z,16Z,19Z)-docosa-4,7,10,13,16,19-hexaenoyl]oxy}-3-phenylpropanoate] 2-benzoate
- Systematic IUPAC name (2aR,4S,4aS,6R,9S,11S,12S,12aR,12bS)-4,11-Dihydroxy-4a,8,13,13-tetramethyl-5-oxo-2a,3,4,4a,5,6,9,10,11,12,12a,12b-dodecahydro-1H-7,11-methanocyclodeca[3,4]benzo[1,2-b]oxete-6,9,12,12b-tetrayl 6,12b-diacetate 9-[(2R,3S)-3-benzamido-2-{[(4Z,7Z,10Z,13Z,16Z,19Z)-docosa-4,7,10,13,16,19-hexaenoyl]oxy}-3-phenylpropanoate] 12-benzoate
- Other names Docosahexaenoyl-paclitaxel; Taxoprexin

Identifiers
CAS Number	199796-52-6
3D model (JSmol)	Interactive image
ChemSpider	5293670
PubChem CID	6918473
UNII	OJE5810C4F
CompTox Dashboard (EPA)	DTXSID00873216
- InChI: InChI=1S/C69H81NO15/c1-8-9-10-11-12-13-14-15-16-17-18-19-20-21-22-23-24-25-35-42-55(74)83-59(57(49-36-29-26-30-37-49)70-63(76)50-38-31-27-32-39-50)65(78)82-52-44-69(79)62(84-64(77)51-40-33-28-34-41-51)60-67(7,53(73)43-54-68(60,45-80-54)85-48(4)72)61(75)58(81-47(3)71)56(46(52)2)66(69,5)6/h9-10,12-13,15-16,18-19,21-22,24-34,36-41,52-54,57-60,62,73,79H,8,11,14,17,20,23,35,42-45H2,1-7H3,(H,70,76)/b10-9-,13-12-,16-15-,19-18-,22-21-,25-24-/t52-,53-,54+,57-,58+,59+,60-,62-,67+,68-,69+/m0/s1 Key: LRCZQSDQZJBHAF-PUBGEWHCSA-N; InChI=1/C69H81NO15/c1-8-9-10-11-12-13-14-15-16-17-18-19-20-21-22-23-24-25-35-42-55(74)83-59(57(49-36-29-26-30-37-49)70-63(76)50-38-31-27-32-39-50)65(78)82-52-44-69(79)62(84-64(77)51-40-33-28-34-41-51)60-67(7,53(73)43-54-68(60,45-80-54)85-48(4)72)61(75)58(81-47(3)71)56(46(52)2)66(69,5)6/h9-10,12-13,15-16,18-19,21-22,24-34,36-41,52-54,57-60,62,73,79H,8,11,14,17,20,23,35,42-45H2,1-7H3,(H,70,76)/b10-9-,13-12-,16-15-,19-18-,22-21-,25-24-/t52-,53-,54+,57-,58+,59+,60-,62-,67+,68-,69+/m0/s1 Key: LRCZQSDQZJBHAF-PUBGEWHCBO
- SMILES: O=C(c1ccccc1)N[C@@H](c2ccccc2)[C@@H](OC(=O)CC\C=C/C\C=C/C\C=C/C\C=C/C\C=C/C\C=C/CC)C(=O)O[C@@H]5C(=C4/[C@@H](OC(=O)C)C(=O)[C@]7([C@H]([C@H](OC(=O)c3ccccc3)[C@@](O)(C4(C)C)C5)[C@@]6(OC(=O)C)[C@H](OC6)C[C@@H]7O)C)/C

Properties
Chemical formula	C_{69}H_{81}NO_{15}
Molar mass	1164.399 g·mol^{−1}
- Except where otherwise noted, data are given for materials in their standard state (at 25 °C [77 °F], 100 kPa). verify (what is ?) Infobox references

DHA-paclitaxel (or Taxoprexin) is an investigational drug (from Protarga Inc) made by linking paclitaxel to docosahexaenoic acid (DHA), a fatty acid that is easily taken up by tumor cells; the DHA-paclitaxel “appears not to be cytotoxic until the bond with DHA is cleaved within the cell.” The advantage of DHA-paclitaxel over paclitaxel is DHA-paclitaxel's ability to carry much higher concentrations of paclitaxel to the cells, which are maintained for longer periods in the tumor cells, thus increasing their action. With increased activity, DHA-paclitaxel, also known as Taxoprexin, may have a more successful response in cancer patients than Taxol, and it may be able to treat more types of cancer than Taxol has been able to treat.

== Clinical trials ==
In 2007, a phase II clinical trial reported "modest activity in patients with oesophago-gastric cancer".
