= Transplacental carcinogenesis =

Transplacental carcinogenesis is a series of genotypic and/or phenotypic changes in the cells of a fetus due to in utero exposure to carcinogens. Specifically, these changes are identified as malignant by virtue of their metastatic potential.

== Transplacental transfer ==
The link between a pregnant mother and the fetus is such that "at all sites of direct cell-to-cell contact, maternal tissues (decidua and blood) are juxtaposed to extraembryonic cells (trophoblast).” According to Cunningham, "after conception, a biomolecular communication system is established between the fetus and mother that is operative from before the time of nidation and continues through and beyond the time of parturition." This communication system is essential to all facets of the pregnancy. "Physiological processes such as fetal nutrition and fetal development progress directly from embryonic/fetal tissue-directed modifications of maternal responses." Notably, the placenta is the principal site of transfer between mother and fetus. A fetus is exposed via the placenta to all substances which are present in the peripheral circulation of the mother. Overall, the abundance of toxins contained within cigarette smoke that is inhaled by the mother exerts a direct impact by altering the placental and fetal cell proliferation and differentiation. The vital balance of cellular activity is disrupted. "The association of in utero exposure to such carcinogens and the subsequent development of cancer has been reported for all childhood cancers combined and particularly for childhood acute lymphoblastic leukemia, lymphoma, and brain tumors."

== Fetal cell sensitivity ==
Fetal cells are most sensitive to carcinogens during the early stages of gestation. Notably, early in the gestational period, there is a high rate of cell division. Additionally, the cells exhibit undifferentiated characteristics. These compounding factors illustrate the basis for this heightened cellular sensitivity to genotoxic agents. For example, it has been proven that during exposure nicotine binds to receptors of the fetal cells through which developmentally important signaling occurs in many developing organs and tissues. Because the binding of these receptors is unanticipated by the regulated activity of the fetal cells it can be inferred that this is a disruption in the cellular process which can lead to detrimental effects such as the deregulation of vital signaling, expression, or repair. As indicated above, should this exposure occur during the early stages of gestation, the fetus will be more susceptible to such damage. In addition to receptor binding, it has also been proven that fetal tissues are suspected as "privileged targets of neoplastic changes" in light of the vast amount of cell proliferation and differentiation taking place. Notably, tumors are arrived at via proliferating cells. In the event that proliferating cells become uncontrolled, by any measure, this mutated activity would certainly be characteristic of an increased risk in one's chances of developing cancer.
