= Agent study =

An agent study is a part of a clinical trial that tests the chemotherapeutic properties of a specific substance. More specifically, an agent study is used to detect whether or not a substance can prevent or inhibit cancer. In a clinical trial, researchers perform multiple studies in order to test the potential of new cancer drugs. An agent study helps determine the potential of a substance to inhibit cancer, before more studies are done in order to further knowledge of this potential.

== Cytotoxic vs. Cytostatic Agents ==
Agent studies are used to determine whether a substance exhibits cytotoxicity or cytostasis. A cytotoxic agent will shrink a tumor, while, a cytostatic agent slows or stops tumor growth and metastases. It is important to determine which of these effects an agent poses so that a proper clinical trial can be designed. For example, a study with a cytotoxic agent will look for tumor shrinkage vs. dose. It is much harder to develop a clinical trial for a cytostatic agent.

== Phase I Clinical Trials ==
Phase I trials are used to determine the maximum tolerated dose of an agent. This dose is then used in the Phase II trials. Maximum tolerated dose is based on the measured toxicity in cytotoxic agents. Cytostatic agents have been demonstrated to show biologic effects while also being nontoxic. It is recommended that cytostatic agent trials determine toxicity as well as evaluation of a biologic end point in response to different doses.

Synonym: Chemoprevention study

== See also ==
- Cancer
- Clinical trial
