= ABT-510 =

Molecular therapeutic drug that was studied as a treatment for cancer

Names
- IUPAC name (2S)-1-[(2S)-2-[[(2S,3S)-2-[[(2S)-2-[[(2S,3R)-2-[[(2R,3S)-2-[[(2S)-2-[[2-[[2-[acetyl(methyl)amino]acetyl]amino]acetyl]amino]-3-methylbutanoyl]amino]-3-methylpentanoyl]amino]-3-hydroxybutanoyl]amino]pentanoyl]amino]-3-methylpentanoyl]amino]-5-(diaminomethylideneamino)pentanoyl]-N-ethylpyrrolidine-2-carboxamide

Identifiers
CAS Number	251579-55-2
3D model (JSmol)	Interactive image
ChEMBL	ChEMBL386115
ChemSpider	5293759
DrugBank	DB05434
PubChem CID	6918562
UNII	CRR8E37XOB
CompTox Dashboard (EPA)	DTXSID80870283
- InChI: InChI=1S/C46H83N13O11/c1-12-18-30(39(64)55-36(26(7)13-2)42(67)53-31(19-16-21-50-46(47)48)45(70)59-22-17-20-32(59)40(65)49-15-4)52-44(69)38(28(9)60)57-43(68)37(27(8)14-3)56-41(66)35(25(5)6)54-33(62)23-51-34(63)24-58(11)29(10)61/h25-28,30-32,35-38,60H,12-24H2,1-11H3,(H,49,65)(H,51,63)(H,52,69)(H,53,67)(H,54,62)(H,55,64)(H,56,66)(H,57,68)(H4,47,48,50)/t26-,27-,28+,30-,31-,32-,35-,36-,37+,38-/m0/s1 Key: RIWLPSIAFBLILR-WVNGMBSFSA-N
- SMILES: CCC[C@@H](C(=O)N[C@@H]([C@@H](C)CC)C(=O)N[C@@H](CCCN=C(N)N)C(=O)N1CCC[C@H]1C(=O)NCC)NC(=O)[C@H]([C@@H](C)O)NC(=O)[C@@H]([C@@H](C)CC)NC(=O)[C@H](C(C)C)NC(=O)CNC(=O)CN(C)C(=O)C

Properties
Chemical formula	C_{46}H_{83}N_{13}O_{11}
Molar mass	994.250 g·mol^{−1}
- Except where otherwise noted, data are given for materials in their standard state (at 25 °C [77 °F], 100 kPa). Infobox references

ABT-510 is a molecular therapeutic drug that was the subject of research as a potential treatment for cancer. According to the Journal of Clinical Oncology, ABT-510 is a "subcutaneously (SC) administered nonapeptide thrombospondin analogue."

Following inconclusive phase I clinical trials, a 2007 phase II study of ABT-510 for treatment of metastatic melanoma failed to reach its primary endpoint resulting in termination of the study. Only three out of twenty-one patients reached the primary endpoint of progression-free survival at 18 weeks, but these three patients remained progression-free for 21, 34, and 42 weeks. However, biomarker data collected during this study showed a decrease in VEGF-C, circulating endothelial cells, and CD146 and CD34/133 counts, and a maximum tolerated dose has still not been established. Further study could consider a higher dose and/or combination treatment.
