= Antigen-presenting cell vaccine =

An antigen-presenting cell vaccine, or an APC vaccine, is a vaccine made of antigens and antigen-presenting cells (APCs).

As of March 2019, the only APC vaccine approved by the American Food and Drug Administration is for prostatic acid phosphatase, a commonly over-expressed prostate cancer antigen.
