= Thymectacin =

Chemical compound

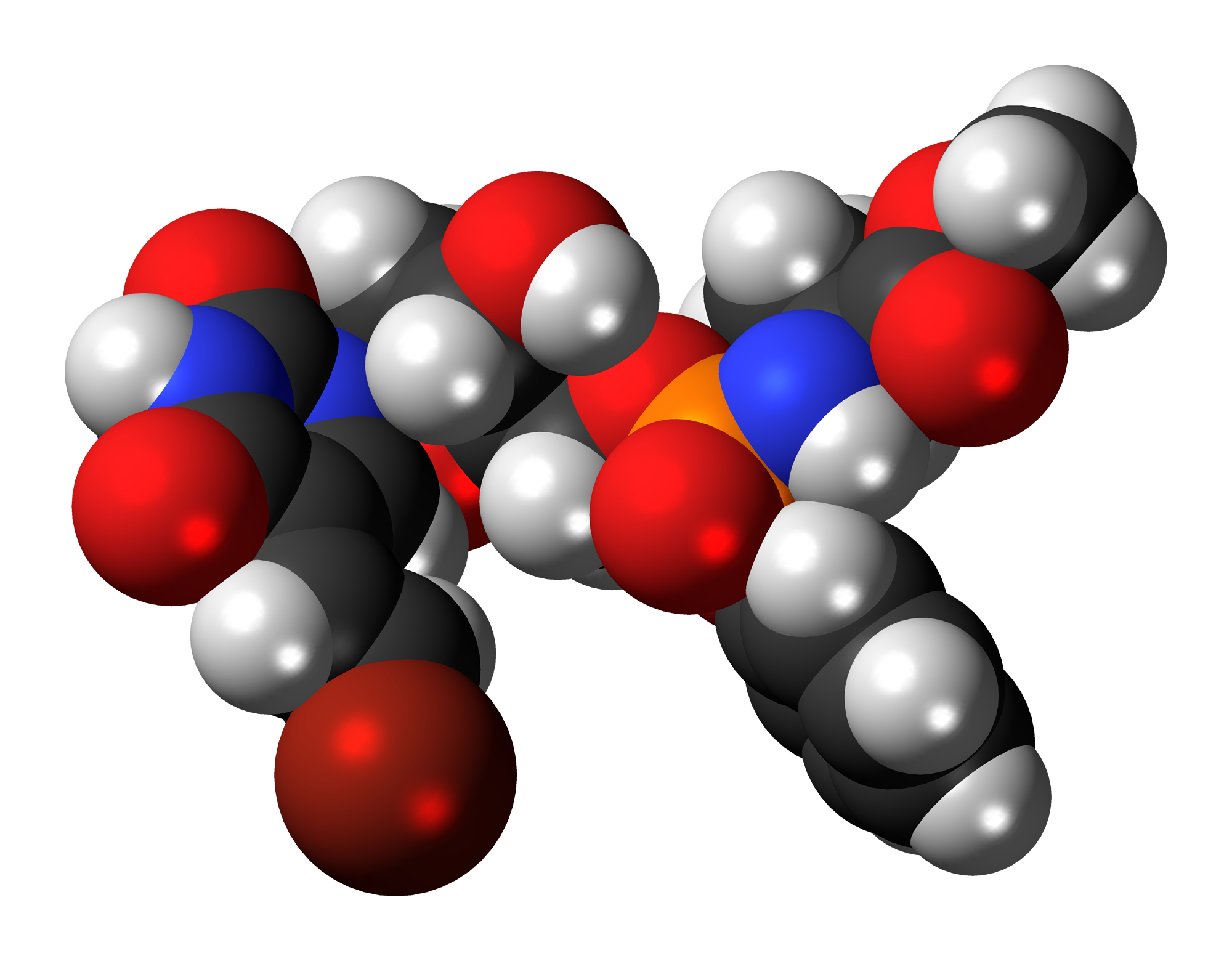

Clinical data
- Other names: NB-1011; NB-101; N-[[5-[(E)-2-Bromovinyl]-2'-deoxyuridin-5'-O-yl]](phenoxy)phosphoryl]-L-alanine methyl ester

Identifiers
- IUPAC name: (2S)-methyl 2-((((2R,3S,5R)-5-(5-((E)-2-bromovinyl)-2,4-dioxo-3,4-dihydropyrimidin-1(2H)-yl)-3-hydroxytetrahydrofuran-2-yl)methoxy)(phenoxy)phosphorylamino)propanoate
- CAS Number: 232925-18-7
- PubChem CID: 6440764
- ChemSpider: 4945015
- UNII: 2ZRZ4TSW3F
- CompTox Dashboard (EPA): DTXSID00177862

Chemical and physical data
- Formula: C_{21}H_{25}BrN_{3}O_{9}P
- Molar mass: 574.321 g·mol^{−1}
- 3D model (JSmol): Interactive image
- SMILES: C[C@@H](C(=O)OC)NP(=O)(OC[C@@H]1[C@H](C[C@@H](O1)n2cc(c(=O)[nH]c2=O)/C=C/Br)O)Oc3ccccc3
- InChI: InChI=1S/C21H25BrN3O9P/c1-13(20(28)31-2)24-35(30,34-15-6-4-3-5-7-15)32-12-17-16(26)10-18(33-17)25-11-14(8-9-22)19(27)23-21(25)29/h3-9,11,13,16-18,26H,10,12H2,1-2H3,(H,24,30)(H,23,27,29)/b9-8+/t13-,16-,17+,18+,35?/m0/s1; Key:CFBLUORPOFELCE-BACVZHSASA-N

Thymectacin (NB-1011, NB-101) is an experimental anticancer prodrug of brivudine monophosphate. It is being developed by New Biotics and it entered in phase I clinical trials for colon cancer in 2006.

Thymectacin is a small molecule phosphoramidate derivative of (E)-5-(2-bromovinyl)-2'-deoxyuridine (BVdU) with potential antineoplastic activity. It is selectively active against tumor cells expressing high levels of thymidylate synthase (TS). Thymectacin is converted intracellularly by TS to bromovinyldeoxyuridine monophosphate (BVdUMP) which competes with the natural substrate, deoxyuridine monophosphate, for binding to TS. Unlike TS inhibitors, this agent is a reversible substrate for TS catalysis. Thus, TS retains activity and converts BVdUMP into cytotoxic metabolites.
