= Glufosfamide =

Names
- IUPAC name β-D-Glucopyranosyl N,N′-bis(2-chloroethyl)phosphorodiamidate
- Systematic IUPAC name (2S,3R,4S,5S,6R)-3,4,5-Trihydroxy-6-(hydroxymethyl)oxan-2-yl N,N′-bis(2-chloroethyl)phosphorodiamidate
- Other names β-D-glucosylisophosphoramide mustard

Identifiers
CAS Number	132682-98-5
3D model (JSmol)	Interactive image
ChEMBL	ChEMBL2107143
ChemSpider	110215
PubChem CID	123628
UNII	1W5N8SZD9A
CompTox Dashboard (EPA)	DTXSID001031222
- InChI: InChI=1S/C10H21Cl2N2O7P/c11-1-3-13-22(19,14-4-2-12)21-10-9(18)8(17)7(16)6(5-15)20-10/h6-10,15-18H,1-5H2,(H2,13,14,19)/t6-,7-,8+,9-,10+/m1/s1 Key: PSVUJBVBCOISSP-SPFKKGSWSA-N
- SMILES: O[C@H]1[C@H](OP(NCCCl)(NCCCl)=O)O[C@H](CO)[C@@H](O)[C@@H]1O

Properties
Chemical formula	C_{10}H_{21}Cl_{2}N_{2}O_{7}P
Molar mass	383.16 g·mol^{−1}
- Except where otherwise noted, data are given for materials in their standard state (at 25 °C [77 °F], 100 kPa). Infobox references

Glufosfamide, also known as glucophosphamide, D-glucose isophosphoramide mustard, D-19575 is an experimental cytotoxic chemotherapeutic agent for treatment of malignancies.

== Chemical structure ==
Glufosfamide is, basically, a glycosidic conjugate between β-D-glucose and the active alkylating moiety of the well-known antineoplastic drug ifosfamide, so-called "isophosphoramide mustard".

== Theoretical advantages ==
Glufosfamide, being a conjugate of glucose and active alkylating moiety of ifosfamide, has the better cell permeability than the parent compound — ifosfamide — or its metabolites. Glufosfamide utilizes the normal cell glucose transport mechanism (a sodium-dependent glucose/sodium co-transporter) for its own transport into the cell. And the glucose uptake mechanism is grossly overexpressed and upregulated in certain cancer cell lines, especially pancreatic cancer, non-small cell lung cancer, and glioblastoma multiforme. This, theoretically, should render them more sensitive to the alkylating effects of glufosfamide while relatively sparing (doing relatively little collateral damage) to the normal cells in which the glucose uptake mechanism is not so upregulated.

== Clinical trials ==
Glufosfamide demonstrated modest efficacy in Phase I and Phase II clinical trials in the treatment of pancreatic cancer, non-small cell lung cancer and recurrent glioblastoma multiforme. A large Phase III trial comparing glufosfamide against 5-FU, both in combination with gemcitabine, for second line treatment of metastatic pancreatic cancer (NCT01954992) is currently active.
