= Magnetic-targeted carrier =

Magnetic-targeted carriers, also known as MTCs or magnetic vehicles, are micro- or nanoparticles that carry an anticancer drug to the target site by using an external magnetic field and field gradient to direct the desired drug. Usually, the complex involves microscopic beads of activated carbon, which bind the anticancer drug. A magnet applied from outside the body then can direct the drug to the tumor site. This can keep a larger dose of the drug at the tumor site for a longer period of time, and help protect healthy tissue from the side effects of chemotherapy.

== Composition and characteristics ==
The use of MTCs as therapeutic agents for oncology treatment has been increasing exponentially over the past decade. Currently the magnetic vehicle composition relies on the properties of the magnetic component, which is usually ferromagnetic, ferrimagnetic or superparamagnetic, owing to their ability of expressing strong magnetization in the same direction of the external magnetic field while also retaining their magnetization once the external magnetic field is removed.

Magnetic vehicles have been focusing on the particle size, aiming to have the MTCs in the nanoscale, which is mainly due to the fact that ferromagnetic and ferrimagnetic materials show remnant magnetization with and without the external magnetic field, which in turn causes particle aggregation complications. Very small nanoparticles exhibit superparamagnetic properties, which are able to obtain a high degree of magnetization while being able to avoid the particle aggregation issue caused by remnant magnetization. Iron oxide is a common metal used for this purpose, which is usually used as magnetite, maghemite or a combination of the two, due to their high magnetization values between the different iron oxides. Iron oxide gives the impression of lacking remnant magnetization even though magnetite and maghemite are ferromagnetic due to thermal fluctuations, which mostly accounts for the internal interactions of the particles affecting energy densities.

MTCs carry the drug molecules to the tumor site by either having them bound to the surface or by being enclosed within the magnetic vehicle, which can be referred to as the MTC-drug complex. Magnetic-targeted carriers possess unique intrinsic properties, developing magnetic polarization and magnetophoretic mobility once the external magnetic field and field gradient are applied. Selective application of the magnetic field gradient is applied to the target area, which in turn guides the MTC-drug complex to the desired location with a relatively high degree of accuracy, minimum surgical intervention and maximum dose. In order to be able to successfully deliver the drug at the desired tumor location, the magnetic vehicles are responsive to a specific tumor signal, which is commonly a temp- or pH-sensitive release due to the higher temperature and lower pH observed in tumor microenvironments, relative to the rest of the body.

== Site-specific targeting requirements ==
Different requirements exist for magnetic nanoparticles involved in site-specific targeting, which are dependent on either physical or biological reasons. The nine different main requirements the magnetic-targeted carrier should possess are the following: 1) Sufficient magnetic moment to overcome drag and yield forces. 2) Superparamagnetism to prevent agglomeration and embolism. 3) Biocompatibility to prevent toxicity, enhance cell survival and reduce inflammatory responses. 4) Biodegradability to improve clearance from the body. 5) Capability to act as a carrier and exhibit controlled sustained release. 6) Structural stability to allow delivery of therapeutic agents after reaching target site. 7) Stealth and functional surface characteristics to prolong the circulation half-life, improve colloidal stability, prevent agglomerations and reduce toxicity. 8) Reproducible sizes and shapes for clinical applications 9) Reproducible and scalable methods to allow mass production.

== Clinical Applications ==
The most common current clinical application involving a MTC-drug complex is the doxorubicin-magnetic targeted carrier complex, which is composed of a formulation of the anthracycline antibiotic doxorubicin and is bound to microscopic beads of activated carbon. Iron is used as the magnetic-targeted carrier.

== History ==
Magnetic vehicles started being used for drug delivery purposes of chemotherapeutic agents around 1960–1970. MTCs composition has varied over the years and differed between in-vitro and in-vivo studies. Dr. Widder synthesized albumin microspheres in the 1970s encasing Adriamycin, a chemotherapeutic drug, and used magnetite as the susceptible magnetic component to the external magnetic field. One of the first in vivo experiments using magnetic vehicles performed in humans was done by John F. Alksne and his associates in the 1960s, using carbon-coated iron and applied an external magnetic field in order to occlude intracranial aneurysms, which was considered a successful therapeutic once the X-ray results were analyzed. Currently, magnetic nanoparticles, such as iron oxide, take advantage of their multimodality since they can integrate various functionalities, such as imaging agents, targeted-delivery and induce hyperthermia. In addition, iron oxide nanoparticles are being tested in emerging medical fields, such as multimodal imaging, theranostics and image-guided therapies.
