= Continuous hyperthermic peritoneal perfusion =

- Specialty: Oncology

Continuous hyperthermic peritoneal perfusion (CHPP) is a procedure in which the abdominal cavity is bathed in warm fluid that contains anticancer drugs. It is a kind of hyperthermia therapy.
