= Breast duct endoscopy =

- Purpose: examine the lining of the lactiferous ducts t

Breast duct endoscopy is a method used to examine the lining of the lactiferous ducts to look for abnormal tissue. A very thin, flexible, lighted tube attached to a camera is inserted through the nipple, and threaded into the breast ducts deep in the breast. Tissue and fluid samples may be removed during the procedure.
