= Bone-seeking radioisotope =

A bone-seeking radioisotope is a radioactive substance that is given through a vein, and collects in bone cells and in tumor cells that have spread to the bone. It kills cancer cells by giving off low-level radiation.
