= Troxacitabine =

Chemical compound

Identifiers
- IUPAC name: 4-amino-1-[(2S,4S)-2-(hydroxymethyl)-1,3-dioxolan-4-yl]pyrimidin-2(1H)-one
- CAS Number: 145918-75-8
- PubChem CID: 151173
- ChemSpider: 399955
- UNII: 60KQZ0388Y
- ChEMBL: ChEMBL359164
- CompTox Dashboard (EPA): DTXSID2048791

Chemical and physical data
- Formula: C_{8}H_{11}N_{3}O_{4}
- Molar mass: 213.193 g·mol^{−1}
- 3D model (JSmol): Interactive image
- SMILES: O=C1/N=C(/N)\C=C/N1[C@H]2O[C@H](OC2)CO
- InChI: InChI=1S/C8H11N3O4/c9-5-1-2-11(8(13)10-5)6-4-14-7(3-12)15-6/h1-2,6-7,12H,3-4H2,(H2,9,10,13)/t6-,7-/m0/s1; Key:RXRGZNYSEHTMHC-BQBZGAKWSA-N

Troxacitabine (brand name Troxatyl) is a nucleoside analogue with anticancer activity. Its use is being studied in patients with refractory lymphoproliferative diseases.
