= Physician Data Query =

Cancer database

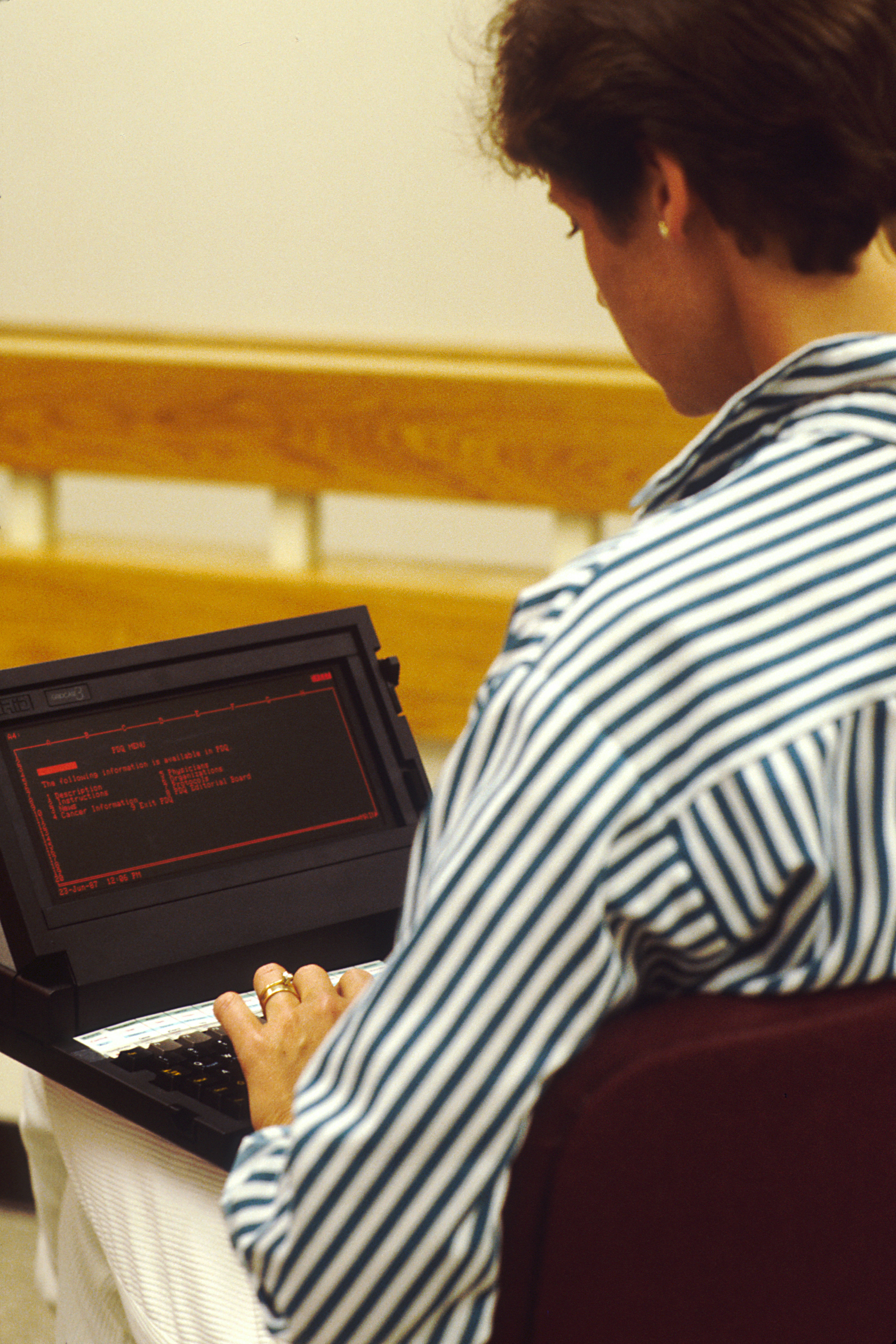
A woman accessing the PDQ database with an early laptop in 1987

Physician Data Query (PDQ) is the US National Cancer Institute's (NCI) comprehensive cancer database.

== Database ==
It contains peer-reviewed summaries on cancer treatment, screening, prevention, genetics, and supportive care, and complementary and alternative medicine; a registry of more than 6,000 open and 17,000 closed cancer clinical trials from around the world; and a directory of professionals who provide genetics services.

PDQ makes available two data resources. The PDQ NCI Cancer Terms Database is a resource of cancer-related terms, curated by a multidisciplinary panel of reviewers, that is released monthly. The NCI Drug Dictionary is a structured list of technical definitions and synonyms for drugs/agents used to treat patients with cancer or conditions related to cancer.

The NCI also makes a browse-able version of the Cancer Terms database available as part of the NCI Terminology Browser
