= Etalocib =

Names
- Preferred IUPAC name 2^{5}-Ethyl-1^{4}-fluoro-2^{2}-hydroxy-8^{2}-propyl-3,7,9-trioxa-1,10(1),2(1,4),8(1,3)-tetrabenzenadecaphane-10^{2}-carboxylic acid
- Other names LY293111; VML 295

Identifiers
CAS Number	161172-51-6
3D model (JSmol)	Interactive image
ChEMBL	ChEMBL329123
ChemSpider	154905
IUPHAR/BPS	2948
KEGG	D04074
PubChem CID	177941
UNII	THY6RIW44R
CompTox Dashboard (EPA)	DTXSID70167073
- InChI: InChI=1S/C33H33FO6/c1-3-9-25-29(12-7-13-30(25)40-31-11-6-5-10-26(31)33(36)37)38-18-8-19-39-32-21-28(35)27(20-22(32)4-2)23-14-16-24(34)17-15-23/h5-7,10-17,20-21,35H,3-4,8-9,18-19H2,1-2H3,(H,36,37) Key: YFIZRWPXUYFCSN-UHFFFAOYSA-N
- SMILES: Fc1ccc(cc1)c4c(O)cc(OCCCOc3cccc(Oc2ccccc2C(=O)O)c3CCC)c(c4)CC

Properties
Chemical formula	C_{33}H_{33}FO_{6}
Molar mass	544.619 g·mol^{−1}
- Except where otherwise noted, data are given for materials in their standard state (at 25 °C [77 °F], 100 kPa). verify (what is ?) Infobox references

Etalocib is a drug candidate that was under development for the treatment of various types of cancer. It acts as a leukotriene B4 receptor antagonist and a PPARγ agonist.

Clinical trials were conducted measuring efficacy for treatment of non-small cell lung cancer and pancreatic cancer and the inflammatory conditions asthma, psoriasis, and ulcerative colitis, but were suspended due to lack of efficacy.
