= ABCD rating =

- Purpose: staging system for prostate cancer

ABCD rating, also called the Jewett staging system or the Whitmore-Jewett staging system, is a staging system for prostate cancer that uses the letters A, B, C, and D.

- “A” and “B” refer to cancer that is confined to the prostate.
- “C” refers to cancer that has grown out of the prostate but has not spread to lymph nodes or other places in the body.
- “D” refers to cancer that has spread to lymph nodes or to other places in the body.
