= Benign proliferative breast disease =

Medical condition

Benign proliferative breast disease is a group of noncancerous conditions that may increase the risk of developing breast cancer. Examples include atypical ductal hyperplasia, atypical lobular hyperplasia, and intraductal papillomas.
