= Signal transduction inhibitor =

Class of pharmaceutical compounds

Signal transduction inhibitors are drugs that block signals passed from one molecule to another inside a cell. Blocking these signals can affect many functions of the cell, including cell division and cell death, and may kill cancer cells and their ability to multiply quickly and invade other tissues.
