= Lerisetron =

Chemical compound

Clinical data
- Other names: F-0930-RS
- ATC code: None

Identifiers
- IUPAC name: 1-Benzyl-2-piperazin-1-yl-1H-benzimidazole
- CAS Number: 143257-98-1
- PubChem CID: 65997
- ChemSpider: 59389
- UNII: Q36R82SXRG
- ChEMBL: ChEMBL56900
- CompTox Dashboard (EPA): DTXSID90162368

Chemical and physical data
- Formula: C_{18}H_{20}N_{4}
- Molar mass: 292.386 g·mol^{−1}
- InChI: InChI=1S/C18H20N4/c1-2-6-15(7-3-1)14-22-17-9-5-4-8-16(17)20-18(22)21-12-10-19-11-13-21/h1-9,19H,10-14H2; Key:PWWDCRQZITYKDV-UHFFFAOYSA-N

Lerisetron (code name F-0930-RS) is a drug which acts as an antagonist at the 5-HT_{3} receptor. It is a potent antiemetic and was in clinical trials for the treatment of nausea associated with cancer chemotherapy.

== See also ==
- 5-HT_{3} antagonist
