= Chemosensitivity assay =

Test of effectiveness of chemotherapy

- Purpose: estimates number of tumor cells that are killed by chemotherapy.

A chemosensitivity assay is a laboratory test that measures the number of tumor cells that are killed by chemotherapy. The test is done after the tumor cells are removed from the body. A chemosensitivity assay may help in choosing the best drug or drugs for the cancer being treated.

With dozens of chemotherapy agents and hundreds of combinations available for treatment, oncologists often select a regimen from standard protocols developed in clinical trials.
