= Visual pathway glioma =

Type of tumor of the eye

Visual pathway glioma is a rare, slow-growing tumor of the eye.
