= Isolated lung perfusion =

Surgical procedure

Isolated lung perfusion is a surgical procedure during which the circulation of blood to the lungs is separated from the circulation of blood through the rest of the body, and a drug is delivered directly into the lung circulation. This allows a higher concentration of chemotherapy to reach tumors in the lungs.
