= Citric acid/potassium-sodium citrate =

Drug used in the treatment of metabolic acidosis

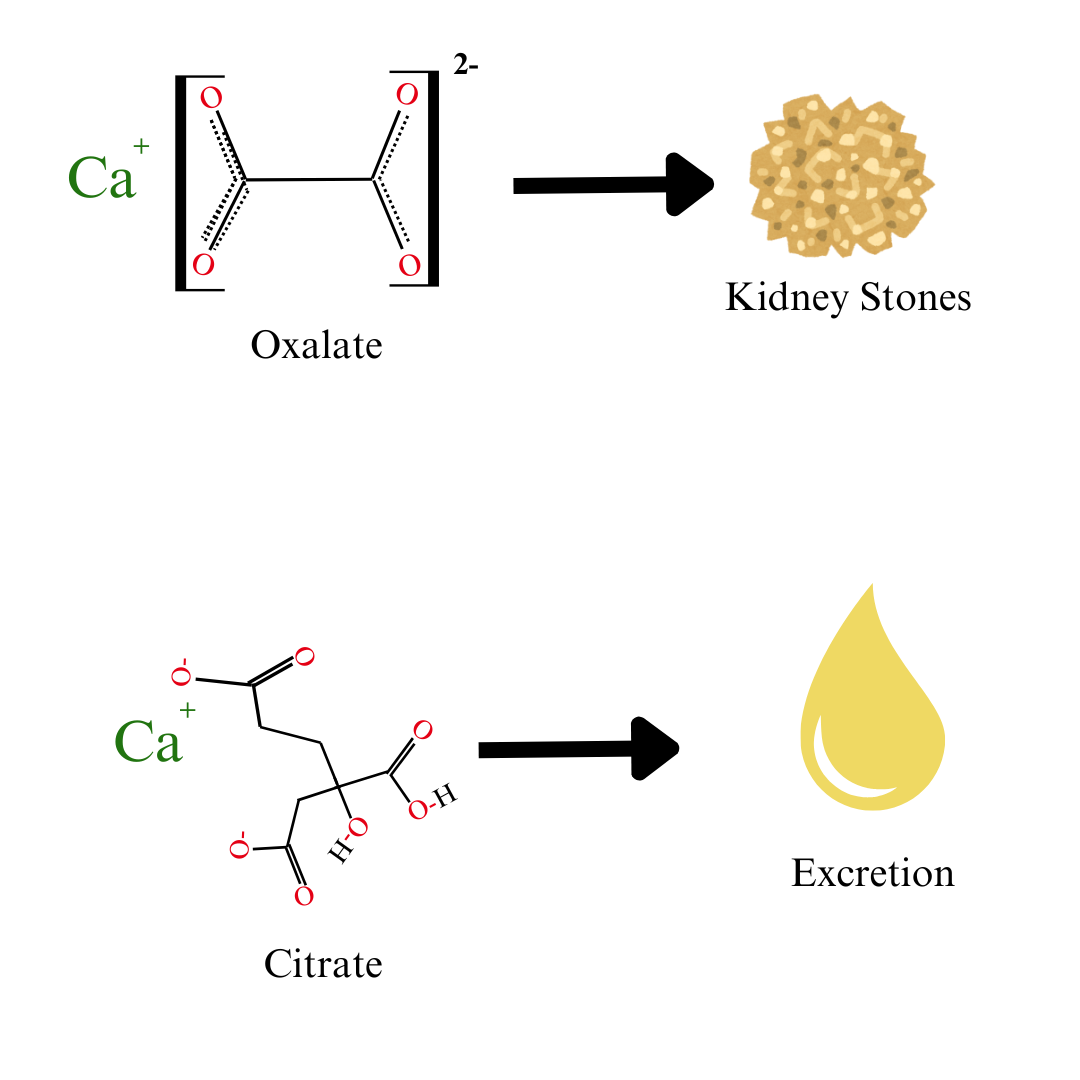
When calcium ions form a complex with oxalate, this can lead to the formation of kidney stones. When calcium forms a complex with citrate, the formation of the calcium oxalate kidney stone is blocked. This then leads to excretion of the calcium through the urine

Citric acid/potassium-sodium citrate is a drug used in the treatment of metabolic acidosis (a disorder in which the blood is too acidic). It is made up of citrate (the weak base of citric acid), a sodium cation and potassium cation.

It can also be used for the treatment of kidney stones by treating hypocitraturia. It does this by lowering the amount of acid in the urine, a process known as alkalinization. Increasing the amount of citrate in the blood is also important for kidney stone prevention because citrate creates chemical complexes with calcium, preventing nucleation and agglomeration with oxalate that leads to kidney stones. Because of these two mechanisms of treatment, it can be used to treat both calcium oxalate and uric acid kidney stones.
