= Cancer Information Service (NIH) =

The Cancer Information Service (CIS) is a program of the National Cancer Institute that provides a telephone hotline for people to receive information on cancer care, prevention, research, and clinical trials. Started in 1975, the CIS now also includes an instant messaging option, and an email. The CIS also provides help to those who wish to quit smoking.

== See also ==
- American Cancer Society Cancer Action Network
- American Cancer Society Center
- National Comprehensive Cancer Network
- NCI-designated Cancer Center
