= Cholangiosarcoma =

Type of bile duct tumor

Cholangiosarcoma is a tumor of the connective tissues of the bile ducts.

Primary risk factors for cholangiosarcoma are Primary Sclerosing Cholangitis and infection by Clonorchis Sinensis (a fluke found in undercooked fish).
