= CBR96-doxorubicin immunoconjugate =

Monoclonal antibody
- Type: ?
- Source: Humanized (from mouse)
- Target: Lewis-Y antigen

Clinical data
- Other names: SGN-15, BMS-182248
- ATC code: none

Identifiers
- CAS Number: 160612-45-3
- ChemSpider: none

cBR96-doxorubicin immunoconjugate (BMS-182248/SGN-15; also known as cBR96-Dox) is an antibody-drug conjugate or (ADC) directed to the Lewis-Y antigen designed for the treatment of cancer. The payload is the chemotherapy drug doxorubicin which is connected with a hydrazone linker to cysteine residues of the Lewis-Y specific (chimeric) monoclonal antibody BR96. Following internalization, the hydrazone is hydrolyzed within the acidic environment of target cell endosomes and lysosomes to release active cytotoxic drug.

== Clinical Development ==
In clinical trials cBR96-Dox was found to be highly active in regressing large human tumor xenografts implanted in mice or rats. Multiple tumor models including lung, breast and colon were evaluated, and cBR96-Dox was found to have broad and potent anti-tumor activity, even in doxorubicin-resistant tumors.
