= 4-Nitroquinoline 1-oxide =

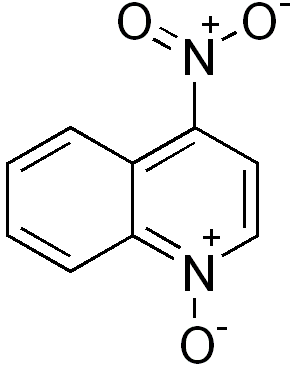

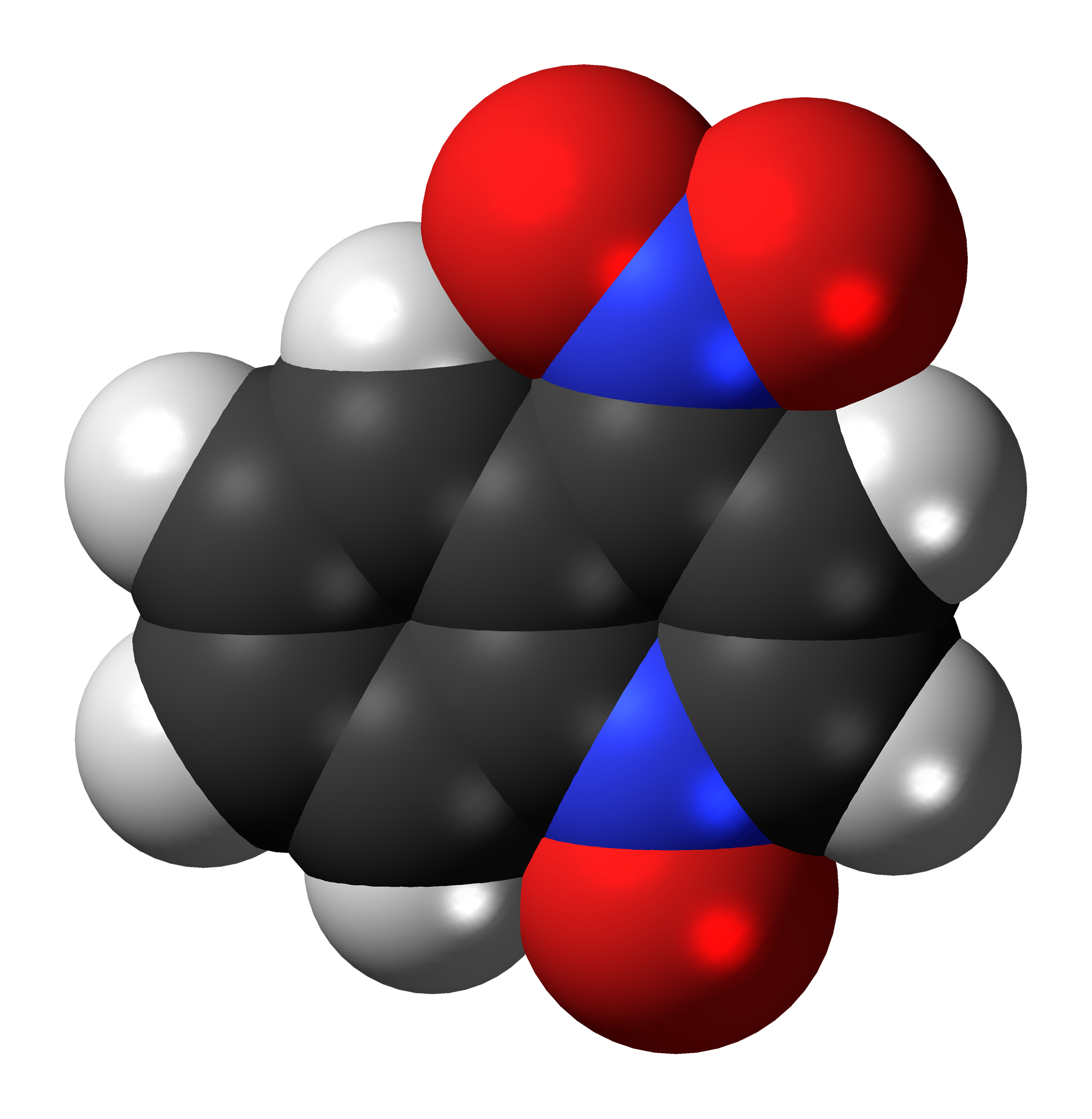

Names
- Preferred IUPAC name 4-Nitroquinolin-1-ium-1-olate

Identifiers
CAS Number	56-57-5
3D model (JSmol)	Interactive image
ChEBI	CHEBI:16907
ChEMBL	ChEMBL127655
ChemSpider	5740
ECHA InfoCard	100.000.256
EC Number	200-281-1
KEGG	C03474
PubChem CID	5955
UNII	X5081510EV
CompTox Dashboard (EPA)	DTXSID5025780
- InChI: InChI=1S/C9H6N2O3/c12-10-6-5-9(11(13)14)7-3-1-2-4-8(7)10/h1-6H Key: YHQDZJICGQWFHK-UHFFFAOYSA-N; InChI=1/C9H6N2O3/c12-10-6-5-9(11(13)14)7-3-1-2-4-8(7)10/h1-6H Key: YHQDZJICGQWFHK-UHFFFAOYAP
- SMILES: [O-][N+](=O)c2c1c(cccc1)[n+]([O-])cc2

Properties
Chemical formula	C_{9}H_{6}N_{2}O_{3}
Molar mass	190.16 g/mol
Appearance	yellow-brown crystals or powder
Melting point	26 to 28 °C (79 to 82 °F; 299 to 301 K)
Boiling point	237 to 243 °C (459 to 469 °F; 510 to 516 K)
Solubility in water	slightly

Hazards
- Occupational safety and health (OHS/OSH)
Main hazards	DANGER: CANCER RISK, causes blood, liver, and thyroid injury; causes DNA adducts
- GHS labelling
Pictograms	(GHS08: Health hazard)
Signal word	Danger
Hazard statements	H350
Precautionary statements	P201, P202, P281, P308+P313, P405, P501
Flash point	101 °C (214 °F; 374 K)
Autoignition temperature	400 °C (752 °F; 673 K)
- Except where otherwise noted, data are given for materials in their standard state (at 25 °C [77 °F], 100 kPa). verify (what is ?) Infobox references

4-Nitroquinoline 1-oxide (also known as 4-NQO, 4NQO, 4Nqo, NQO and NQNO) is a quinoline derivative and a tumorigenic compound used in the assessment of the efficacy of diets, drugs, and procedures in the prevention and treatment of cancer in animal models. It induces DNA lesions usually corrected by nucleotide excision repair.

== General ==
4-nitroquinoline 1-oxide (4NQO) is a quinoline, a carcinogenic and mutagenic chemical. Quinolines, like 4NQO, possess a heterocyclic aromatic structure and the same basic chemical formula of C_{9}H_{7}N. 4NQO may naturally occur in the environment but is typically manufactured for research purposes. 4NQO is known to mimic the biological effects of ultraviolet light on various organisms. Both 4NQO and its reduced metabolite 4-hydroxyaminoquinoline 1-oxide (4HAQO) bind covalently to cellular macromolecules such as nucleic acids and proteins.

4NQO has been shown to trap topoisomerase I cleavage complexes. It may also induce DNA damage through the production of reactive oxygen species thought to arise from enzymatic reduction of its nitro group, although its exact mechanism is unknown. 4NQO’s reactive oxygen species may serve as a byproduct of DNA damage or signaling molecule from damage. In response to damage from 4NQO, cells attempt to repair and initiate a transcriptional response to detoxify the cell from 4NQO and its metabolites.

== Technical ==
DNA damage by 4NQO is a potent model. 4NQO induces DNA lesions usually corrected by nucleotide excision repair. 4NQO’s four electron reduction product, 4-hydroxyaminoquinoline 1-oxide (4HAQO), is believed to be a carcinogenic metabolite of 4NQO. When 4NQO is metabolized to its electrophilic reactant, selyl-4HAQO, it reacts with DNA to form stable quinolone monoadducts considered responsible for its mutagenicity and genotoxicity.

The stable quinolone monoadducts oxidize to form 8-hydroxydeoxyguanosine (8OHdG), which, if left unrepaired, lead to transversions of guanines to thymines, which are nucleotides in DNA. Despite the direct mutagenic properties of 4HAQO, it is less toxic than 4NQO, indicating that metabolism of 4NQO produces other reactive chemicals such as anion radical metabolites.

Yeast species have been used to map polymorphic regions in response to 4NQO, identifying the polymorphic transcription factor Yrr1. Yrr1 confers 4NQO resistance to wild-type S. cerevisiae yeast, binding upstream from core genes well-known to regulation drug response. Yrr1 shifts cellular response in resistance to 4NQO and rates of respiration. In a recent study in yeast, 4NQO was shown to affect chromatin remodelling, cell division and DNA damage repair pathways.
