= O. H. Frazier =

American physician (born 1940)

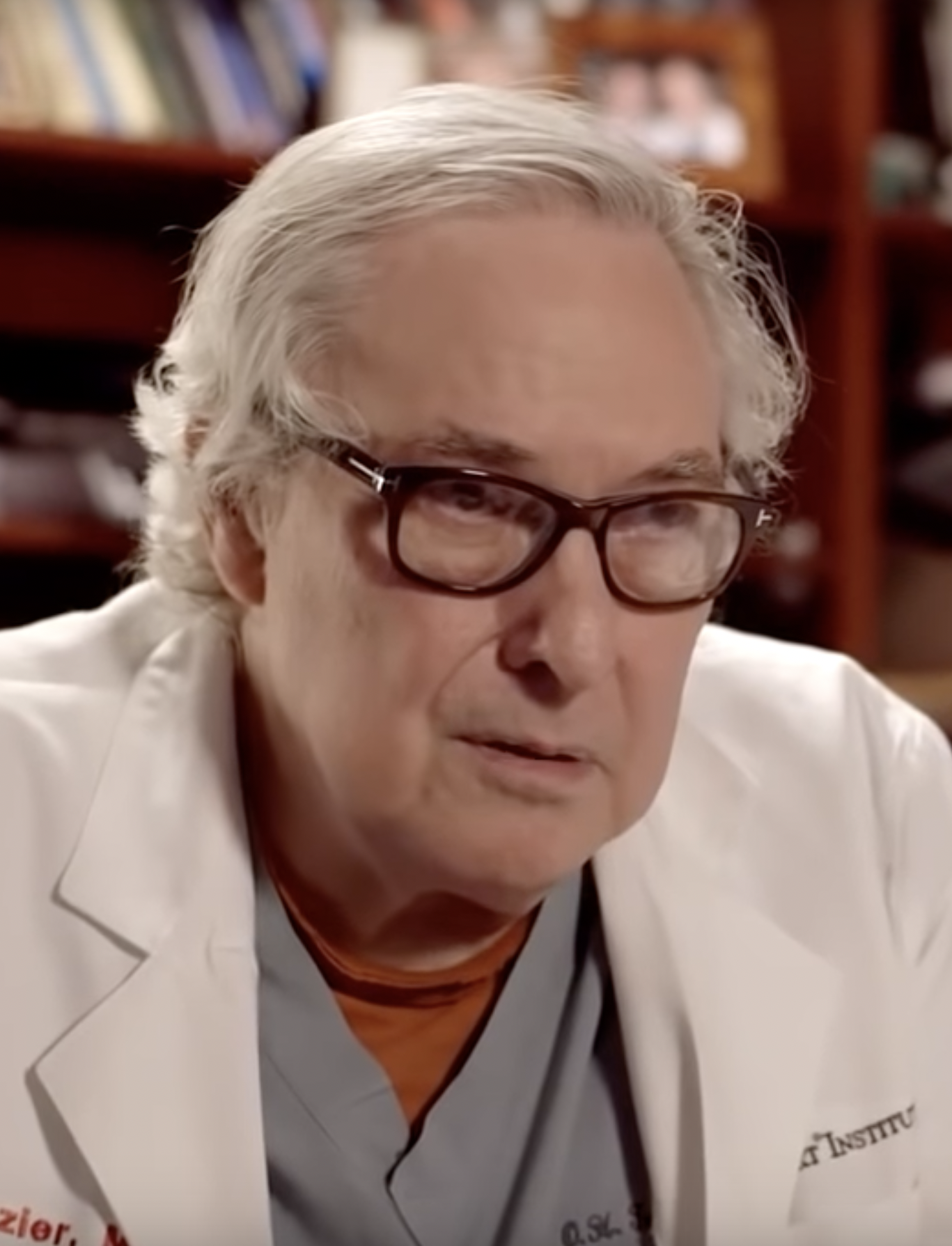
- Frazier in 2014
- Born: Oscar Howard Frazier Jr. April 16, 1940 (age 86); Stephenville, Texas, U.S.
- Education: University of Texas at Austin; Baylor College of Medicine
- Occupation: Cardiovascular surgeon
- Known for: First U.S. implantation of the HeartMate II pump into a human; First implantation of the Jarvik 2000 into a human; First successful implantation of a continuous-flow TAH into a human
- Medical career
- Profession: Cardiovascular surgeon
- Institutions: Baylor St. Luke's Medical Center; The University of Texas Health Science Center at Houston
- Research: Left ventricular assist device; artificial heart
- Awards: ISHLT Lifetime Achievement Award 2018

O. H. "Bud" Frazier (born April 16, 1940) is an American heart surgeon and director of cardiovascular surgery research at the Texas Heart Institute (THI), best known for his work in mechanical circulatory support (MCS) of failing hearts using left ventricular assist devices (LVAD) and total artificial hearts (TAH).

His achievements in heart surgery include the implantation of the first long-term LVAD, the pulsatile HeartMate I in 1986, and the replacement of a diseased heart with a continuous flow device using two HeartMate II pumps, in 2011. His most significant achievements have been in the development of the non-pulsatile implantable LVADs, the Jarvik, HeartMate II and HeartWare.

In 1963, Frazier entered medicine school at Baylor College of Medicine (BCM) after completion of a degree in history from the University of Texas-Austin. Under the mentorship of, Michael E. DeBakey at BCM, and then Denton Cooley at The Texas Heart Institute, he performed research on the testing of LVADs as a form of MCS. He continued to lead and become significantly influential in heart surgery and the development and clinical implementation of LVADs and his surgical career at the THI has spanned over fifty years.

Other positions held by Frazier include chief of the transplant service at Baylor St. Luke's Medical Center (part of the Catholic Health Initiatives system) in Houston, professor of surgery — Cardiothoracic Transplantation & Circulatory Support for BCM; and Director of Surgical Research for THI.

== Early life and education ==
Oscar Howard Frazier Jr. was born and grew up in Stephenville, Texas, in a Methodist household. Both his parents were teachers and his grandfather nicknamed him "Bud" after a distant cousin who was killed in a West Texas saloon shootout at the turn of the nineteenth century.

A "former high school football star", he was initially destined for a career in football, having been asked by Darrell Royal to play for the University of Texas at Austin as a kicker. However, after attending only a few two-a-day football practices, a leg injury ended his football career. Despite this, he later became a black belt in Karate.

Frazier, at first gained admission to study history and literature at law school, but switched to medicine, after being influenced by the writings of Anton Chekhov and William Carlos Williams. Interviewed for medicine on the 4 July, he won a place at Baylor College of Medicine, atypically on the ability to answer a question on history. He subsequently completed his BA degree in history from the University of Texas-Austin in 1963 before commencing medical education.

== Medical education ==
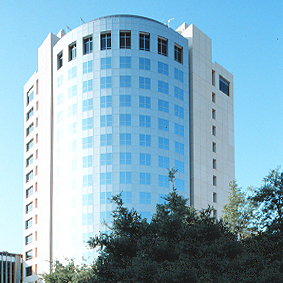
Baylor College of Medicine (BCM)

As a medical student at BCM in 1964, he assisted in experimental total artificial hearts (TAH) research, which placed him under the mentorship of Michael E. DeBakey, Domingo Liotta and Denton A. Cooley, who five years later, controversially became the first to implant one.

In 1966, at the age of 25, while still a medical student of DeBakey, who he described as a “tough taskmaster”, an experience with a teenager who had just had an aortic valve repair, left a lasting impression on him. Frazier was required to manually massage the teenager's heart following a cardiac arrest. He has since repeatedly recounted "that as long as I was massaging that kid's heart, he would wake up... I thought then, and I've often returned to this: If my hand can keep this kid alive, why couldn't we make a device to do the same?" It was this incident and the experience with DeBakey's research that instilled his interest in cardiac surgery and MCS's.

Of the twenty four students that Frazier started his residency with, only five were left. DeBakey, intolerable of error, fired most.

Upon graduating with an MD in 1967, he also received the DeBakey Award for Outstanding Surgical Student before then completing his residency at Baylor Affiliated Hospitals in 1968.

== Vietnam ==
Frazier served in the United States Army from 1968 to 1970 and distinguished himself as a flight surgeon in the U.S. Army 48th Assault Helicopter Company in the Vietnam War. Once, he was shot down and on return to the States, has described how demoralised he felt about what men were capable of during war.

For his achievements, he received three medals, the Combat Flight Medal, Vietnamese Navy Medal, and the Vietnamese Distinguished Service Medal.

== Surgical career ==
After Vietnam, Frazier returned as a surgical resident to BCM.

He remained at BCM until 1974 when he gravitated towards LVAD-research at the near-by THI and subsequently joined Baylor's new rival Cooley, at the THI for further surgical training, which he completed in 1976.

=== Left ventricular assist devices (LVAD) and total artificial hearts (TAH) ===
Throughout the 1970s and 1980s, he continued experimental work toward the development of the implantable long-term pulsatile HeartMate I LVAD. In 1976, he worked with John C. Norman and the first intra-abdominal LVAD. In 1985, during his tenure on the advisory board of the National Heart, Lung, and Blood Institute (NHLBI), Frazier recommended that research be initiated on a TAH that would be fully implantable and that would allow people to be discharged and to live a normal lifestyle. In 1986, Frazier successfully used the HeartMate I LVAD in a person with severe irreversible heart failure who was waiting for a heart transplant. Driven by compressed air, the HeartMate LVAD had a textured blood-contacting inner surface, in contrast to a smooth surface. This encouraged a living lining of endothelial cells resembling the inner surfaces of arteries and veins and hence required less blood thinning drugs.

Over the course of four decades, his work in the field of other LVAD prototypes, continued with experimental studies that resulted in the first intravascular, implantable, continuous-flow pump (Hemopump), which he first implanted into a human in April 1988.

When funding for TAH research was restored in January 1991, Frazier became involved in further animal experiments. In 1994, he instigated research on the HeartWare LVAD and described the first long-term clinical use of a LVAD. This person was the first to make hospital discharge with a LVAD. His most significant contribution was the development of the nonpulsatile implantable LVADs, the Jarvik, HeartMate II and HeartWare. After more than ten years of research, in 2000, he performed the first implant of the Jarvik 2000 LVAD into a human, also a continuous flow pump.

By the end of 2013, Frazier and his THI team had implanted their 1,000th LVAD, more than fifty years after Cooley founded the THI and just short of fifty years after DeBakey at BCM was awarded the original NHI grant for the development of an artificial heart. His innovations in the surgical treatment of severe heart failure, heart transplantation and MCS to be used either to substitute for or to assist the pumping action of the human heart led to the THI gaining a reputation as a global leader of transplantation and MCS programmes. Frazier performed more than 1,300 heart transplants and implanted 1,000 LVADs, exceeding the performance of any other contemporary surgeon in the world during his career.

=== Successful implantation of a continuous flow device ===
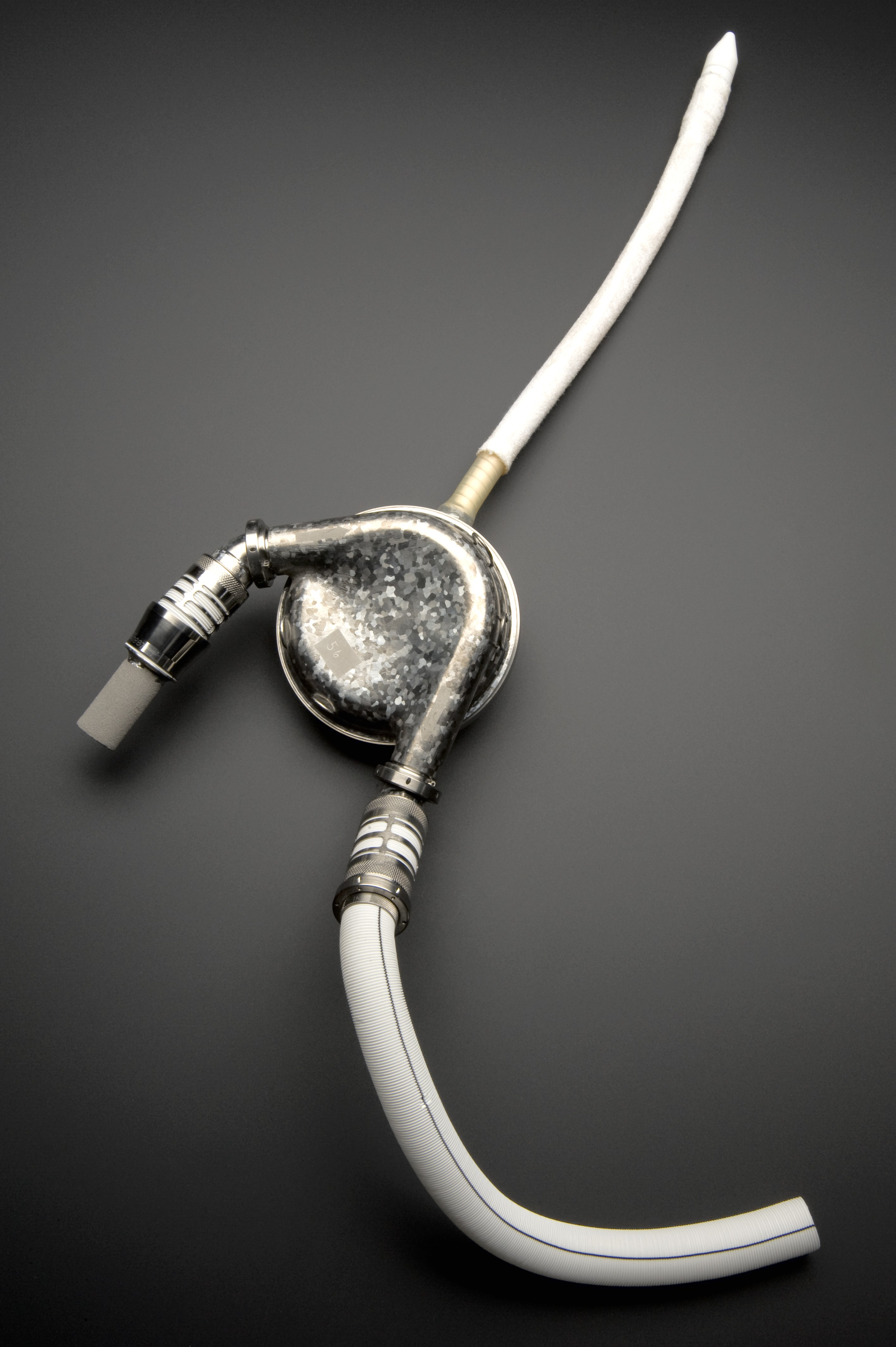
‘Heartmate’ left ventricular-assist device, United States Wellcome L0066304

In March 2011, Craig Lewis was suffering from amyloidosis and not eligible for heart transplant due to the severity and extent of the disease, affecting also his kidney and liver. Unsuitable for a heart transplant, temporary mechanical TAH or LVAD, his small diseased heart was replaced with a continuous flow device, a pair of HeartMate II pumps, an apparatus of two pumps embraced together, following six years of research on more than fifty calves at the Texas Institute. He awoke from a coma and spent the last five weeks of his life interacting with his family. During the following year, Frazier and his colleague William Cohn engaged with the public and professionals on their experiences. Their TEDMED talk introduced them to Daniel Timms, who was driven to find a technological resolution and whose father had died of heart failure. Timms had an idea and sought out Frazier and Cohn in the States. The surgeons became interested, particularly with the idea that Timms's device had the potential to be a small size. Trialed in numerous calves between 2013 and 2016, some were able to run a treadmill after implantation.

== Appointments ==
Frazier has been Professor of surgery at the University of Texas Health Science Center in Houston, Clinical professor of surgery at the University of Texas M.D. Anderson Cancer Center, co-director of Center for Preclinical Surgical & Interventional Research at the Texas Heart Institute, and Tenured professor at Baylor College of Medicine.

He has served on the editorial boards of several medical journals, including Circulation, the Journal of the American Heart Association, and The Journal of Heart and Lung Transplantation.

He was a chairman of the federal affairs committee for the American Society for Artificial Internal Organs and served on other prominent national committees, including the education committee of the American Society of Transplant Surgeons and the advisory board of the NHLBI.

Frazier served as president of The Denton A. Cooley Surgical Society and the American Society for Artificial Internal Organs.

== Awards and honors ==
Medical honors include the Living Legend Award from the World Society of Cardiothoracic Surgeons, BCM Distinguished Alumnus Award, University of Texas Distinguished Alumnus Award, the Gift to Mankind Award from the American Organ Transplant Association, the Distinguished Surgeon Award from the Houston Surgical Society, Honored Physician Award from the American Heart Association Guild, the Ray C. Fish Award for Scientific Achievement from the Texas Heart Institute and the Denton A. Cooley Cardiovascular Surgical Society International Recognition Award. In 2014, Dr. Frazier was presented with the Lifetime Achievement and Distinguished Faculty Award from the Michael E. DeBakey department of surgery at BCM. Frazier's award presentation preceded keynote speaker, former Vice President Dick Cheney, whose life was extended by the technology Frazier helped to develop.

Since 2014, the International Society of Heart and Lung Transplantation (ISHLT) has awarded the "O.H. Frazier Award" in MCS Translational Research sponsored by Medtronic.

In 2018, the ISHLT awarded Frazier with their ISHLT Lifetime Achievement Award in acknowledgement of his work on severe heart failure, heart transplantation and mechanical circulatory support.

In 2021, the American Association for Thoracic Surgery (AATS) distinctly honored Frazier with the Scientific Achievement Award, the highest recognition the Association can bestow. Previous recipients include Dr. Michael DeBakey, Dr. Denton Cooley, and Sir Magdi Yacoub.

Published in 2018, a book entitled Ticker, recounts the story of Frazier's task to construct a sustainable totally implantable artificial heart. The author describes Frazier sharing traits with pioneers in other fields and how for over half a century been driven by the desire to save lives. In response, reviewers have either been intrigued to what drives Frazier or have debated the ethics surrounding TAHs and LVADs.

== Controversies ==
In 2018, ProPublica and the Houston Chronicle published an investigation into Frazier, claiming that he had been "accused of violating federal research rules and skirting ethical guidelines, putting his quest to make medical history ahead of the needs of some patients." Frazier subsequently sued the authors of the investigation, as well as ProPublica and the Houston Chronicle, for defamation, claiming that articles written about him had contained misleading statements "calculated to falsely portray Dr. Frazier as an inhumane physician." The back-and-forth legal battle came to a close in 2024, when a Texas state appeals court ordered the lawsuit dismissed.

== Personal and family ==
Frazier has previously led Sunday school and collects rare books. He is married to Rachel, and they have two children, Todd, who graduated from the Juilliard School of Music and became a composer, and Allison, a writer.

== Selected publications ==
- Frazier, O.H. (1996). "Evolution of battery-powered, vented left ventricular assist devices". The Annals of Thoracic Surgery. 61 (1): 393–395. doi:10.1016/0003-4975(95)00945-0. PMID 8561612.
- Norman, John C. (1981). "Intracorporeal (Abdominal) Left Ventricular Assist Devices or Partial Artificial Hearts". Archives of Surgery. 116 (11): 1441–5. doi:10.1001/archsurg.1981.01380230059009. PMID 7305657..
- Frazier, OH; Rose, EA; McCarthy, P; Burton, NA; Tector, A; Levin, H; Kayne, HL; Poirier, VL; Dasse, KA (1995). "Improved mortality and rehabilitation of transplant candidates treated with a long-term implantable left ventricular assist system". Ann Surg. 222 (3): 327–36, discussion 336-8. doi:10.1097/00000658-199509000-00010. PMC 1234813. PMID 7677462.
- Frazier, O.H.; Delgado, Reynolds M. (2003). "Mechanical Circulatory Support for Advanced Heart Failure". Circulation. 108 (25): 3064–3068. doi:10.1161/01.CIR.0000090962.04121.9E. PMID 14691020..
- Gemmato, CJ; Forrester, MD; Myers, TJ; Frazier, OH; Cooley, DA (2005). "Thirty-five years of mechanical circulatory support at the Texas Heart Institute: an updated overview". Tex Heart Inst J. 32 (2): 168–77. PMC 1163464. PMID 16107108.
- Frazier, O.H. (2014). "Mechanical circulatory assist device development at the Texas Heart Institute: A personal perspective". The Journal of Thoracic and Cardiovascular Surgery. 147 (6): 1738–1744. doi:10.1016/j.jtcvs.2014.04.019. PMID 24837720.
