= St. Luke's Health =

Health system in Texas

- Formerly: St. Luke's Episcopal Hospital
- Company type: Private
- Founded: 1954; 72 years ago
- Area served: Houston, Texas, U.S.
- Parent: CommonSpirit Health
- Website: www.stlukeshealth.org

St. Luke's Health is a health system located in the Greater Houston area, Texas. It is a part of one of the largest health systems and the second largest faith-based health system in the United States, CommonSpirit Health. St. Luke's Health's facilities have been recognized as some of the best in the nation.

== History ==
St. Luke's Episcopal Hospital was founded by the Episcopal Diocese of Texas in 1954 and was one of the first hospitals established in the Texas Medical Center. In 1962, Denton A. Cooley founded the Texas Heart Institute, which became affiliated with St. Luke's Episcopal Hospital. It was there that Denton A. Cooley performed the first successful heart transplantation in the United States in 1968 and the first artificial heart implantation in the world in 1969.

In 1990, St. Luke's Episcopal Hospital's 26-story O'Quinn Medical Tower was constructed and has since become a Texas Medical Center icon. In 1997, the Episcopal Diocese of Texas established the St. Luke's Episcopal Health System. It established its first freestanding emergency center in 2000 and opened two more in subsequent years. St. Luke's continued to expand as it opened a hospital in The Woodlands, Texas, in 2003. A year later, St. Luke's Episcopal Hospital entered into an affiliation agreement with Baylor College of Medicine. St. Luke's then proceeded to open a hospital in Sugar Land, Texas, in 2008, another in The Woodlands in 2009, and two more in Northwest Houston and East Houston in 2010.

In 2013, St. Luke's Episcopal Health System announced the transfer of its hospitals to Catholic Health Initiatives, a national nonprofit, and changed its name to CHI St. Luke's Health. CHI St. Luke's Health has continued to expand, opening its seventh hospital campus in January 2016.

== Affiliations ==
=== Baylor College of Medicine ===
St. Luke's began its partnership with Baylor College of Medicine in 1961 to serve as a teaching hospital for its medical students.

A joint venture between CHI St. Luke’s Health and Baylor College of Medicine established CHI St. Luke’s Health–Baylor St. Luke’s Medical Center, which has been nationally recognized and ranked by U.S. News & World Report and other entities.

Led by world-renowned expert and surgeon Dr. David Sugarbaker, the collaboration introduced the first comprehensive, multi-specialty Lung Institute in Texas, based at CHI St. Luke’s Health–Baylor St. Luke’s Medical Center. The Lung Institute’s Mesothelioma Treatment Center continues to attract patients from all over the world.

=== Texas Heart Institute ===
In 1962, St. Luke's began its relationship with Texas Heart Institute, founded by Denton A. Cooley. It was there that Denton A. Cooley performed the first successful heart transplant in 1968 and the first to implant an artificial heart in 1969.

Located in CHI St. Luke’s–Baylor St. Luke’s Medical Center, Texas Heart Institute has been consistently named one of the top ten heart centers in the United States by U.S. News & World Report and is one of the largest transplant centers in the world.

CHI St. Luke’s has continued to strengthen its affiliation with Texas Heart Institute, investing to expand its research and education initiatives.

=== Other Affiliations ===
Other clinical affiliations of CHI St. Luke's Health include The University of Texas MD Anderson Cancer Center's Radiation Treatment Center and The University of Texas MD Anderson Regional Care Center. In 2006, its affiliation with Texas Children's Hospital began when CHI St. Luke's Health transferred its obstetrics unit to Texas Children's.

Other educational affiliations of CHI St. Luke's Health include The University of Texas Medical School at Houston, The University of Texas Medical Branch (Galveston), Houston Baptist University, and Prairie View A&M University.

== Recognition ==
=== Achievements ===
In 1968, Denton A. Cooley completed the first successful heart transplantation in the US at Texas Heart Institute. A year later, he completed the first artificial heart implantation. The second implantation of an artificial heart in a human was completed at the same location in 1981.

Additional “firsts” from Texas Heart Institute include the first bridge-to-transplant with an LVAD in 1978, the first laser angioplasty procedure in America in 1985, and the first laser coronary endarterectomy procedure in America in 1985.

In 1986, Texas Heart Institute performed the first peripheral laser procedure in Texas– and one of the first in the United States– and the first implant of the HeartMate pneumatically powered LVAD as a bridge-to-transplant. In 1991, the first patient in the world left the hospital with an electric, portable, battery-powered LVAD.

In 2000, Texas Heart Institute became the first site for clinical trials of the Jarvik 2000. The next year, Texas Heart Institute became the first to demonstrate that C-Reactive Protein (CRP) causes vascular inflammation. That same year, Texas Heart Institute performed its 100,000th open heart operation.

In 2003, Texas Heart Institute became the first nationally ranked cardiovascular center in the United States to open a cath lab medical simulation training center and performed the first implantation of a HeartMate II LVAD in the United States. The next year, they conducted the first FDA-approved clinical trial of adult stem cell therapy for congestive heart failure in the United States.

Texas Heart Institute performed its 1,000th heart transplant in 2006 and its 1,000th carotid artery stent procedure for stroke prevention in 2012. In 2010, researchers pioneered a breakthrough technique for turning ordinary human skin cells into early-stage heart cells. In 2011, Texas Heart Institute performed the first successful implantation of a continuous-flow total artificial heart in a human.

In 2013, CHI St. Luke’s Health–Baylor St. Luke's Medical Center performed its 500th liver transplantation, more than any other hospital in Houston at the time. That same year, Baylor St. Luke’s Medical Center became the first hospital in Texas to earn 3 Beacon Awards for Excellence from the AACN. In 2014, Baylor St. Luke’s Medical Center completed its 1,000th left ventricular assist device implantation. The same year, it became the first hospital in the state of Texas to use the FIRMap Catheter to treat arrhythmia patients.

In 2014, CHI St. Luke’s Health–Sugar Land became the first hospital in the Houston area and the fifth hospital in the world to use the latest intuitive da Vinci Xi Surgical System.

In 2015, CHI St. Luke’s Health–Baylor St. Luke’s Medical Center and Baylor College of Medicine opened the first comprehensive, multi-specialty Lung Institute in Texas under the leadership of Dr. David J. Sugarbaker.

=== Awards ===
==== CHI St. Luke’s Health–Baylor St. Luke’s Medical Center ====
CHI St. Luke's Health–Baylor St. Luke's Medical Center is home to Texas Heart Institute. It has been ranked 24 years in a row among the nation’s top 10 Cardiology & Heart Surgery Centers by U.S. News & World Report. Texas Heart Institute has also been named among the top “100 Hospitals with Great Heart Programs” in 2014 by Becker’s Hospital Review.

CHI St. Luke' Health–Baylor St. Luke's Medical Center's Comprehensive Stroke Center received the Target: Stroke Honor Roll Elite Achievement Award and the Get With The Guidelines®– Stroke Silver Plus Quality Achievement Award from the American Stroke Association in 2014. The hospital was recognized by Becker’s Hospital Review as one of the 2014 “100 Hospitals and Health Systems with Great Oncology Programs."

In 2012, it became the second hospital in the state of Texas and the first in Houston to earn the International Organization for Standardization’s ISO 9001:2008 Quality Management System certification. In 2013, CHI St. Luke's Health–Baylor St. Luke's Medical Center became the first hospital in the state of Texas to earn 3 Beacon Awards for Excellence from the AACN. Also in regards to its nursing program, the hospital received ANCC Magnet® Designation for Nursing Excellence four times in 2001, 2005, 2009, and 2014.

==== CHI St. Luke’s Health–Lakeside Hospital ====
CHI St. Luke's Health–Lakeside Hospital has been named by Modern Healthcare magazine as one of the “Best Places to Work” in 2015, 2013, 2012, and 2011. It also received the 2014 “Texas Hospital Quality Improvement Award” by the Texas Hospital Association, T.O.R.C.H., and TMF Health Quality Institute. In 2013, it was awarded the International Organization for Standardization’s ISO 9001:2008 Quality Management System certification and was distinguished as one of the 2013 top hospitals for surgery in Houston by Consumer Reports.

==== CHI St. Luke’s Health–Sugar Land Hospital ====
In 2012, CHI St. Luke's Health–Sugar Land Hospital received the NRC Picker’s Path to Excellence Award.

==== CHI St. Luke’s Health–The Vintage Hospital ====
CHI St. Luke's Health–The Vintage Hospital has been voted the “Best Hospital in Northwest Houston” in 2015, 2014, and 2013 by Houston Community Newspapers readers' choice awards. It has also been named one of the 2014 “20 Most Beautiful Hospitals in the U.S.” by Soliant Health. In 2014, it was recognized by Houston Community Newspapers as the “Best Workplace” in Northwest Houston.

CHI St. Luke's Health–The Vintage Hospital's Women’s Services department received a “Distinguished Rating” by the TDSHS in 2013. It was awarded the ISO 9001:2008 certification in 2014 from DNV Healthcare.

==== CHI St. Luke’s Health–The Woodlands Hospital ====
CHI St. Luke's Health–The Woodlands Hospital was ranked as one of the top ten best regional Houston metro hospitals in 2012 by U.S. News & World Report. It received the “Exemplary Five Star Service Award” in vital statistics registration by the TPHA for the 3rd year in a row in 2012.

It earned national accreditation in 2014 as a Comprehensive Stroke Center by Det Norske Veritas Healthcare, Inc. The hospital received the Target: Stroke Honor Roll Elite Achievement Award and the Get With The Guidelines®– Stroke Silver Plus Quality Achievement Award from the American Stroke Association in 2013 and 2015. Its Pharmacy Department earned the “Best Practice Award” and the “Site of the Year” by Comprehensive Pharmacy Services in 2013.

CHI St. Luke's Health–The Woodlands Hospital was named one of the "Best Hospitals in the Texas Piney Woods" and recognized as performing highly in geriatrics in 2013 and 2014 by U.S. News & World Report. It was designated as a “Pathway to Excellence™” hospital by the ANCC in 2014.

== Hospitals ==
St. Luke's Health comprises seven hospitals, three freestanding emergency centers, six medical groups, and four outpatient and specialty clinics.

=== Hospitals ===
- St. Luke's Health–Baylor St. Luke's Medical Center
- St. Luke's Health–The Woodlands Hospital
- St. Luke's Health–Sugar Land Hospital
- St. Luke's Health–Lakeside Hospital
- St. Luke's Health–The Vintage Hospital
- St. Luke's Health–Patients Medical Center
- St. Luke's Health–Springwoods Village Hospital
- St. Luke's Health–Brazosport Hospital
- St. Luke's Health-Livingston Hospital
- St. Luke's Health-Lufkin Hospital

=== Freestanding Emergency Centers ===
- Baylor St. Luke's Emergency Center–Holcombe
- Baylor St. Luke's Emergency Center–Pearland
- Baylor St. Luke's Emergency Center–Huntsville

=== Medical Groups ===
- St. Luke's Medical Group Galleria IM/Rheum
- St. Luke's Medical Group TMC Internal Medicine
- St. Luke's Medical Group Springwoods Village
- St. Luke's Medical Group The Woodlands
- St. Luke's Medical Group The Vintage
- St. Luke's Medical Group Sugar Land

=== Outpatient and Specialty Clinics ===
- Diagnostic and Treatment Center
- Radiation Therapy and CyberKnife
- Wound Care Clinic at The Woodlands
- Performance Medicine
- Outpatient Clinic in Trinity, Texas

== See also ==
- St. Luke's Texas Liver Coalition
