= Joseph Lamelas =

Cuban-American cardiothoracic surgeon

Joseph Lamelas is a Cuban-American cardiothoracic surgeon who is the Director with the Center for Minimally Invasive Heart Surgery at NCH Rooney Heart Institute in Naples, Florida. Lamelas developed the "Miami Method", a technique for minimally invasive approach to aortic valve replacement and repair.

He is board certified in thoracic surgery and a member of the American Association for Thoracic Surgery (AATS) and the Society of Thoracic Surgeons (STS).

Lamelas had previous appointments at The University of Miami Health System, Mount Sinai Medical Center (Miami), Baylor College of Medicine, St. Luke's Hospital (Houston, Texas), and The Texas Heart Institute.

== Legal issues ==
On June 24, 2024, Lamelas was mentioned by the Department of Justice in Medicaid fraud. Specifically, he was named as one of the "three heart surgeons who performed at St. Luke's - engaged in a regular practice of running two operating rooms at once and delegating key aspects of extremely complicated and risky heart surgeries to unqualified medical residents."

== Education ==
Lamelas completed his Doctor of Medicine degree at Universidad Central del Este in the Dominican Republic, his general surgery residency at the Brooklyn Hospital Center in New York City, and his cardiothoracic surgery residency at the SUNY Downstate Health Sciences University in Brooklyn, New York.
