= The Heartbeats (big band) =

US musical group

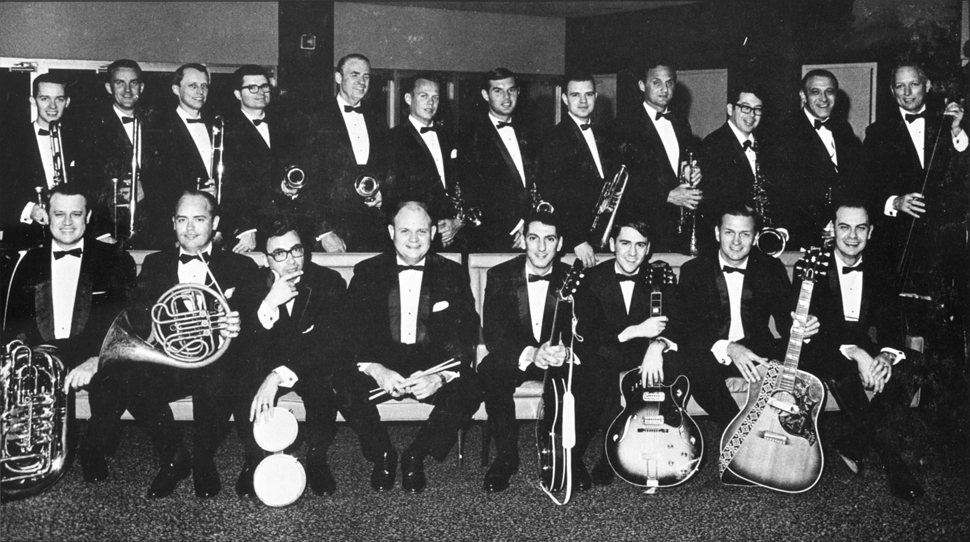
Album cover photo of The Heartbeats

The Heartbeats, formerly The Heartstrings and later the Jazz Medics, is an American big band made up of medical doctors.

In 1965, Dr. Denton A. Cooley and Dr. Grady L. Hallman, both of the Texas Heart Institute in Houston, Texas, started a band made up of doctors. The band was named The Heartstrings because most of the doctors worked in cardiology and stringed instruments (Dr. Cooley played the upright bass) dominated the original lineup. The band quickly grew into a swing band featuring saxophones, trumpets and trombones, thus prompting the changing of the band’s name to The Heartbeats.

The Heartbeats originally performed at parties for their medical colleagues. As the band became known around Houston, they were asked to perform at larger social events that were fundraisers for the Texas Heart Institute and other medical institutions in Houston, as well as for organizations that support the arts, such as the Contemporary Arts Museum Houston. The band most commonly performed a short (about 30 minutes) set during the event. Working as such, The Heartbeats shared the bandstand with some of Houston’s top dance bands.

The Heartbeats recorded in 1968 an album of popular music titled “Presenting, The Heartbeats.” Among the tunes covered were Tijuana Taxi, Java, Yesterday, and When the Saints Go Marching In. Proceeds from the sale of the album went to the Texas Heart Institute for the construction of additional facilities at the Baylor St. Luke’s Medical Center and Texas Children’s Hospital and for research and teaching in the field of heart disease. A second album of popular music titled “The Heartbeats Again” was released in 1972, again with proceeds benefitting the Texas Heart Institute. Tunes on this second album include Classical Gas; A String of Pearls; Mercy, Mercy, Mercy; and What the World Needs Now.

The make-up of the band evolved over the years as some of the original members left the Houston area and new members joined. By the mid-1970s, the band had migrated away from the Texas Heart Institute and was then made up of doctors with a wide range of specialties. In 1974, the name of the band was changed to the Jazz Medics in a reflection of this increasing professional diversity. Today, the Jazz Medics remains a volunteer band, primarily performing for groups at retirement homes, hospices, private events, and the like in the Houston area.

After the deaths of Dr. Cooley (on November 18, 2016) and Dr. Hallman (on January 13, 2017), local interest in The Heartbeats increased. On May 29, 2017, KHOU, the CBS network affiliate in Houston, aired a short piece on the evening news about the Jazz Medics / The Heartbeats in which long-time band members were interviewed to reflect on the founding of the band and its evolution over the years.

== Dr. John Hill ==
Prominent Houston cosmetic surgeon, John Hill, was a member of the Heartbeats. He was a skilled amateur musician who often hosted and performed private recitals for guests in his elaborate home recital hall. Dr. Hill became notorious when he was tried for murder in the death of his socialite wife, Joan Robinson Hill. A mistrial was declared, but Hill was murdered in a robbery inside his home in 1972 before a second trial could be scheduled.
