= Mary Bryan =

Mary Bryan may refer to:

- Mary Bryan (poet) (1780–1838), English Romantic poet and novelist
- Mary Edwards Bryan (1846–1913), American journalist and author
- Mary Baird Bryan (1861–1930), American suffragette and writer
- Mary K. Bryan (1877–1962), American botanist
- Mary deGarmo Bryan (1891–1986), American dietitian and professor
- Mary Taylor Bryan (1901–1978), American artist
- Mary G. Bryan (1910–1964), American archivist
- Mary Bryan (badminton) (1935–2017), Irish badminton player
- Mary Bryan, a fictional character in an episode of Tales of the Unexpected

== See also ==
- Mary Brian (1906–2002), American actress
- Mary Bryant (disambiguation)
