= Sugarbaker =

Sugarbaker may refer to:

- Sugar-baker, a profession as the owner of a sugar house
- Allan Sugarbaker
- David Sugarbaker (1953–2018), American physician
- Paul Sugarbaker (born 1941), American surgeon
- Suzanne Sugarbaker, fictional character from American sitcom Designing Women
