= Hyperthermic intrathoracic chemotherapy =

- Other names: HITOC
- Specialty: Oncology

Hyperthermic intrathoracic chemotherapy (HITOC) is part of a surgical strategy employed in the treatment of various pleural malignancies. The pleura in this situation could be considered to include the surface linings of the chest wall, lungs, mediastinum, and diaphragm. HITOC is the chest counterpart of HIPEC. Traditionally used in the treatment of malignant mesothelioma, a primary malignancy of the pleura, this modality has recently been evaluated in the treatment of secondary pleural malignancies (e.g. thymic tumors, secondary pleural carcinosis).

Metastases to the pleural surface from any primary tumor represents Stage IV disease which carries in general an extremely poor prognosis. In addition; in highly selected situations the pleura can be involved by local spread or “seeding” from thoracic tumors such as lung, esophageal, and thymic cancers.

Secondary pleural malignancies include metastasis from distant primary tumors including breast, colon, ovarian, uterine and renal cell carcinoma among others; as well as certain sarcomas and pseudomyxoma peritonei.

Treatment options for such advanced diseases are limited to systemic chemotherapy, radiation, and supportive care measures. These may include management for shortness of breath due to recurrent, symptomatic malignant pleural effusions.

However, the surgical removal of large pleural deposits with infusion of hyperthermic chemotherapy may offer significant survival and symptomatic benefit for patients in this disease category.

The rationale for this approach is the simultaneous utilization of three different antineoplastic strategies: surgical resection, chemotherapy, and hyperthermia.

The goal of surgical cytoreduction is to remove all gross disease including tumors that are in resectable areas of the lung or other structures and any large pleural nodules. After complete resection of visible disease, the chest cavity is perfused with hyperthermic chemotherapy with the goal of treating microscopic or minimally visible disease. The chemotherapy bathes the inside of the chest in concentrations that are very effective against the cancer cells but without the level of toxicity that could occur if the chemotherapy was given through the blood stream.

The increased heat of the chemotherapy perfusion can itself injure the cancer cells and makes the chemotherapy more effective.

== Diseases treated ==
- Thymoma and Thymic carcinoma: These tumors which arise from the thymus gland in the upper part of the chest overlying the heart, can seed the pleural surfaces in addition to invading the lung and other structures.
- Mesothelioma: A benign (noncancerous) or malignant (cancerous) tumor affecting the lining of the chest or abdomen. Exposure to asbestos particles in the air increases the risk of developing malignant mesothelioma.
- Lung cancer: Usually when a lung cancer spreads to the pleural surface, the cancer has also spread to distant sites making the HITOC procedure unlikely to control the disease. In very highly selected situations there may be seeding of the chest that is contained and possible to treat with HITOC.

There are other intra-abdominal malignancies that may cross the diaphragm and cause disease in the chest that could be potentially helped by HITOC. Some examples would include:

- Pseudomyxoma peritonei: A build-up of mucus in the peritoneal cavity. The mucus may come from ruptured ovarian cysts, the appendix, or from other abdominal tissues, and mucus-secreting cells may attach to the peritoneal lining and continue to secrete mucus.
- Ovarian Carcinoma: Cancer that forms in tissues of the ovary. Most ovarian cancers are either ovarian epithelial carcinomas (cancer that begins in the cells on the surface of the ovary) or malignant germ cell tumors (cancer that begins in egg cells).
- Mucinous appendiceal carcinoma: A type of cancer that begins in cells that line the appendix and produce mucin (the main component of mucus).
- Low grade sarcomas: Sarcoma is a cancer of the bone, cartilage, fat, muscle, blood vessels, or other connective or supportive tissue. Low-grade refers to cancerous and precancerous growths with cells that look nearly normal under a microscope and are less likely to grow and spread quickly than cells in high-grade cancerous or precancerous growths.
