= David Sugarbaker =

American physician (1953–2018)

- Born: David John Sugarbaker; August 5, 1953; Jefferson City, Missouri, U.S.
- Died: August 29, 2018 (aged 65); Houston, Texas, U.S.
- Education: Wheaton College; Cornell University Medical School
- Known for: Establishing first non-cardiac division of thoracic surgery in the U.S. Developing first general thoracic surgical training track in the U.S. First to develop the multimodality therapy for mesothelioma patients First to introduce the goal of macroscopic complete resection
- Medical career
- Profession: Surgeon
- Institutions: CHI St. Luke's Health–Baylor St. Luke's Medical Center; Baylor College of Medicine
- Sub-specialties: Thoracic surgery

David John Sugarbaker (August 5, 1953 – August 29, 2018) was an American physician who was chief of the division of general thoracic surgery and the director of the Baylor College of Medicine Lung Institute at CHI St. Luke's Health–Baylor St. Luke's Medical Center in Houston, Texas. He was an internationally recognized thoracic surgeon specializing in the treatment of mesothelioma, the surgical management of malignant pleural mesothelioma, and treatment of complex thoracic cancers.

== Early life ==
Sugarbaker grew up in Jefferson City, Missouri, as one of ten children of Everett Dornbush Sugarbaker (1910–2001), a cancer surgeon, and Gevena Ione (née Van Dyke, 1911–2015), a registered nurse. He was the younger brother of the surgeon Paul Sugarbaker. Sugarbaker spent his high school and college years helping his father in the operating room, visiting patients outside of town, and becoming interested in medicine.

He graduated cum laude with a Bachelor of Science in 1975 from Wheaton College in Illinois.

He graduated at the top of his class with his medical degree from Cornell University Medical School in 1979 and married Linda Sterk two weeks before beginning his surgical internship. He completed a residency in surgery at Brigham and Women's Hospital in Boston and a residency in cardiothoracic surgery at Toronto General Hospital, where he served as chief resident in both thoracic surgery and cardiac surgery. He then became chief resident in cardiac surgery at Toronto General Hospital and a resident in pediatric cardiac surgery at The Hospital for Sick Children in Toronto, Ontario.

== Career ==
Sugarbaker began his career in 1988, focusing primarily on pleural mesothelioma. Following the completion of his residency training, Sugarbaker was appointed chief at Brigham and Women's Hospital in Boston, where he founded and built the first non-cardiac division of thoracic surgery in the United States. The division grew under his leadership to become the largest of its kind in the United States. Sugarbaker was a leader in the establishment of the Tissue and Blood Repository at Brigham and Women's Hospital. A year later, Sugarbaker completed the first ever lung transplant in Massachusetts. In 1992, Sugarbaker developed the first general thoracic surgical training track in the U.S. and has since trained over 80 residents and placed about two-thirds of his graduates into academic positions. In addition to his career at Brigham and Women's Hospital, Sugarbaker began as Professor of Surgery at Harvard Medical School in 1999. In 2002, he founded the International Mesothelioma Program (IMP) with the central goal of finding a cure for the disease. The program is the largest of its kind and attracts patients from all over the world.

Sugarbaker arrived at the Texas Medical Center (TMC) in 2014 and that same year founded the new Division of General Thoracic Surgery, the Lung Institute, which integrates medical and surgical treatments for benign and malignant non-cardiac thoracic diseases, and the Mesothelioma Treatment Center (MTC), focused on the evaluation and treatment of patients with mesothelioma.

As Director of the Baylor College of Medicine Lung Institute at CHI St. Luke's Health–Baylor St. Luke's Medical Center, Sugarbaker led the first multi-specialty Lung Institute in Texas, focused on the treatment of lung disease.

Over time, Sugarbaker had refined the techniques of extrapleural pneumonectomy, developed methods to perform intraoperative heated chemotherapy, and conducted multiple clinical trials to establish the appropriate intraoperative chemotherapies to be delivered. His later research focused on improving drugs for therapy of malignant pleural mesothelioma. The goal of Sugarbaker's project was to uncover potential targets for therapy in cancer through the development of new bioinformatic tools and functional analysis algorithms.

== Recognition ==
Sugarbaker was known worldwide for his expertise in the surgical management of malignant pleural mesothelioma and of complex thoracic cancers.

Castle Connolly has annually named Sugarbaker as one of "America's Top Doctors" since 2002 and gave him special distinctions in 2007 and 2009.

In 2006, Sugarbaker was awarded the inaugural Crystal Ball Clearly Time Award by the Lung Cancer Alliance.

Sugarbaker was a pioneer in the treatment of mesothelioma. He was the first to develop the multimodality therapy for patients with the disease. He championed the techniques of cytoreductive surgery and was the first to introduce the goal of macroscopic complete resection. Recognized for his efforts, Sugarbaker received the Pioneer Award from Mesothelioma Applied Research Foundation in 2012.

In 2013, he received the Henry D. Chadwick Medal, the highest honor awarded by the Massachusetts Pulmonary Section of the American Lung Association of the Northeast's Medical & Scientific Branch for meritorious contributions in the study and treatment of thoracic diseases.

== Death and legacy ==
Sugarbaker died on August 29, 2018. Dr. Joseph S. Coselli emphasized Dr. Sugarbaker's focus on quality care, commenting, "I was honored to work with him for the last 4 years in the Department of Surgery at BCM ... He was a pioneer and a leader in the treatment of mesothelioma. ... No one else in our lifetime had more impact on the field of thoracic surgery.".
