= Cytoreductive surgery =

Surgical procedure in cancer treatment

Cytoreductive surgery (CRS) is a surgical procedure that aims to reduce the amount of cancer cells in the abdominal cavity for patients with tumors that have spread intraabdominally (peritoneal carcinomatosis). The ultimate goal of CRS is to achieve complete gross resection (CGR); in other words, to remove all visible disease from the abdominal cavity. It is often used to treat ovarian cancer but can also be used for other abdominal malignancies.

CRS is often used in combination with hyperthermic intraperitoneal chemotherapy (HIPEC); for some cancer diagnoses it considerably increases life expectancy and reduces the rate of cancer recurrence.

Its main developer was Paul Sugarbaker, who is known for the development of cytoreductive surgery followed by hyperthermic intraperitoneal chemotherapy, or HIPEC, a treatment alternately referred to as the Sugarbaker Procedure.

== Ovarian cancer ==
Among patients with stage III epithelial ovarian cancer, the addition of HIPEC to interval cytoreductive surgery resulted in longer recurrence-free survival and overall survival than surgery alone and did not result in higher rates of side effects.

== Colorectal cancer ==
Among colorectal cancer patients with peritoneal carcinomatosis cytoreductive surgery, with the addition of HIPEC can be used to prolong overall survival in patients. In a typical case an incision is made from the sternum down to the pelvis, and cancerous cells are removed. Then heated chemotherapy liquid is poured in to destroy remaining cells. The procedure, which may take 15 hours, is risky, and followed by prolonged recovery.
