= Hipec =

Hipec may refer to:

- Hipec, a Canadian aircraft fabric covering process
- Hyperthermic intraperitoneal chemotherapy, a type of hyperthermia therapy
