= Peritoneal mesothelioma =

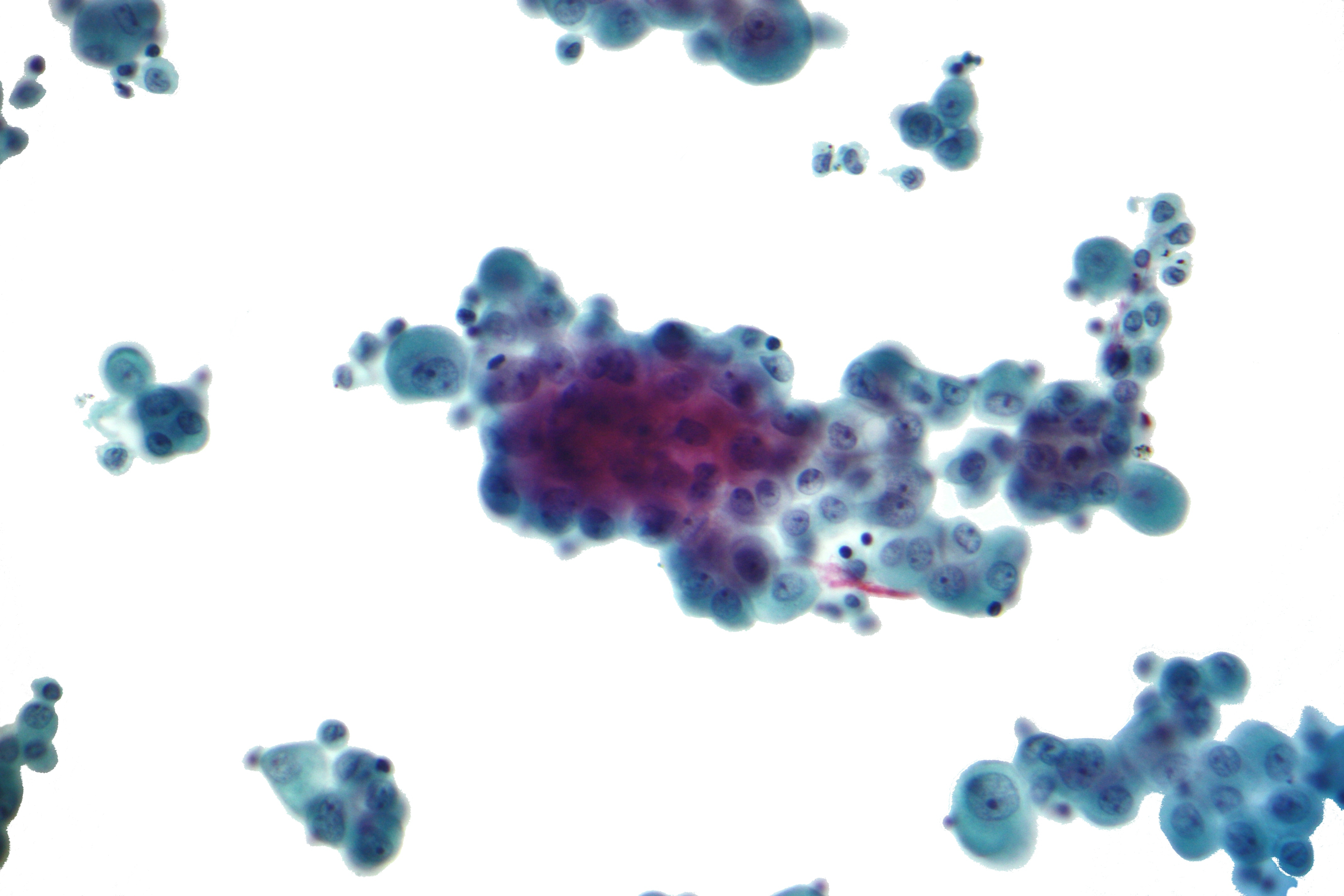
- Micrograph of a cytopathology specimen showing mesothelioma. The cytopathologic appearance of mesothelioma in the pleural cavity and peritoneal cavity is not distinguishable.
- Specialty: Oncology

Peritoneal mesothelioma is the name given to the cancer that attacks the lining of the abdomen. This type of cancer affects the lining that protects the contents of the abdomen and provides a lubricating fluid to enable the organs to move and work properly.

The peritoneum is made of two parts, the visceral and parietal peritoneum. The visceral peritoneum covers the internal organs and makes up most of the outer layer of the intestinal tract. Covering the abdominal cavity is the parietal peritoneum.

== Symptoms and signs ==
Symptoms of peritoneal mesothelioma are often nonspecific and include abdominal pain, abdominal swelling or distension, and weight loss. Abdominal swelling frequently results from ascites, an accumulation of fluid in the abdominal cavity. Other symptoms may include loss of appetite, nausea, early satiety, and changes in bowel habits. Less common manifestations include bowel obstruction, fever, and the development of an abdominal mass or hernia.

== Causes ==
As for other mesotheliomas, asbestos is a known cause of peritoneal mesothelioma in humans.

A 1975 study of three small villages in central Cappadocia, Turkey—Tuzköy, Karain and Sarıhıdır—found that peritoneal mesothelioma was causing 50% of all deaths. Initially, this was attributed to erionite, a zeolite mineral with similar properties to asbestos, but detailed epidemiological investigation demonstrated that the substance causes the disease mostly in families with a genetic predisposition to mineral fiber carcinogenesis. The studies are being extended to other parts of the region.

== Diagnosis ==
Peritoneal mesothelioma may exhibit three patterns on computed tomography (CT): dry, wet, and mixed. The dry pattern is characterized by one or more peritoneal masses with little or no ascites. The wet pattern is associated with ascites and numerous small peritoneal nodules or plaques, generally without a dominant mass. The mixed pattern combines features of both. These imaging findings are not sufficient to establish a definitive diagnosis. When ascites is present, fluid may be collected through paracentesis for cytological examination. However, examination of ascitic fluid alone has limited diagnostic value for peritoneal mesothelioma because malignant cells may be sparse or difficult to distinguish from other cells. Definitive diagnosis generally requires a tissue biopsy, obtained through image-guided needle sampling or surgery, followed by histopathological and immunohistochemical examination.

== Treatment ==
Given its rarity, there are no established guidelines for the treatment of peritoneal mesothelioma. The modern approach to malignant peritoneal mesothelioma includes cytoreductive surgery, hyperthermic intraperitoneal chemotherapy (HIPEC), intraperitoneal chemotherapy, and intravenous chemotherapy. These are often used in conjunction and in a complementary fashion, and this multifaceted approach has significantly improved outcomes when compared to intravenous chemotherapy alone. For instance, the reported median survival time for patients with stage IV mesothelioma as reported by the American Cancer Society is 12 months; however, with adequate cytoreduction, intraperitoneal, and intravenous chemotherapy combined, some authors report 10-year survival rates projected at nearly 75%.

Multiple factors have been shown to be significant in predicting the outcome and overall survival. Age greater than 60 at surgery, more overall disease burden (defined as a Peritoneal Cancer Index (PCI) greater than 15), complete cytoreduction (no visible disease), and epithelioid subtype pathology have all been shown to be predictors of both mortality and disease progression. These known predictors notwithstanding, many patients with advanced peritoneal mesothelioma are still surgical candidates, and even patients with the highest possible score on the peritoneal carcinomatosis index (39) can be completely reduced to a PCI of 0 with adequate surgery.

== See also ==
- Asbestosis
- Malignant mesothelioma
- Serous carcinoma
