= Pseudomyxoma Survivor =

UK-based charity

Pseudomyxoma Survivor is a global charity (non-profit) which supports and advises patients with pseudomyxoma peritonei. It is registered with the Charity Commission for England and Wales as charity number 1143642 and provides specialist health care information and financial support to people affected by pseudomyxoma peritonei.

The charity is listed by Macmillan Cancer Support as the primary support route for pseudomyxoma peritonei and is also recognised by the UK National Health Service and by Cancer Research UK as a useful source of information and support for their patients.

The charity is a member of the European Organisation for Rare Diseases, a non-governmental umbrella organisation which promotes research on rare diseases.

The patron of the charity is Sean Hepburn-Ferrer, the son of Audrey Hepburn who died of pseudomyxoma peritonei in 1993. Sean was successfully nominated by the charity as 'rare disease day ambassador' for 2015.

== See also ==
- Cancer in the United Kingdom
