= Mary Bryant (disambiguation) =

Mary Bryant (1765–after 1794) was a Cornish convict who escaped from an Australian penal colony.

Mary Bryant may also refer to:

- Mary Anne Bryant (1845–1903), American farm organizer
- Mary E. Bryant, namesake of an elementary school in the Hillsborough County Public Schools

== See also ==
- The Incredible Journey of Mary Bryant, 2005 Australian miniseries about the Australian convict
- Mary Bryan (disambiguation)
