= Mary Taylor Bryan =

American artist

Mary Lewis Taylor Bryan (January 15, 1907 – September 22, 1978) was an American artist, known for her watercolor paintings. She was a prolific artist in watercolor and several other media and divided her time between Gloucester, Massachusetts, and Jeffersonville, Vermont.

Bryan and her husband, artist Alden Bryan, operated the Bryan Gallery on Rocky Neck in Gloucester for over 30 years in the summers. Following her death, the Mary Bryan Memorial Gallery was founded on Main Street (Vermont Route 108) in the Jeffersonville Historic District in 1984, in her memory. Bryan is the only woman artist historically associated with the area.

== Early life and education ==
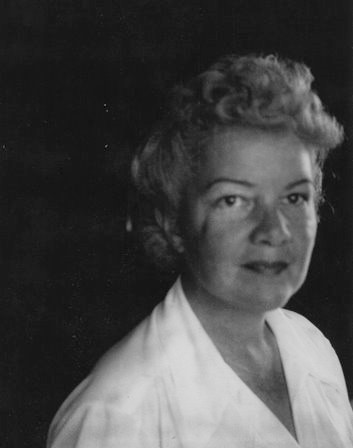
Artist Mary Taylor Bryan

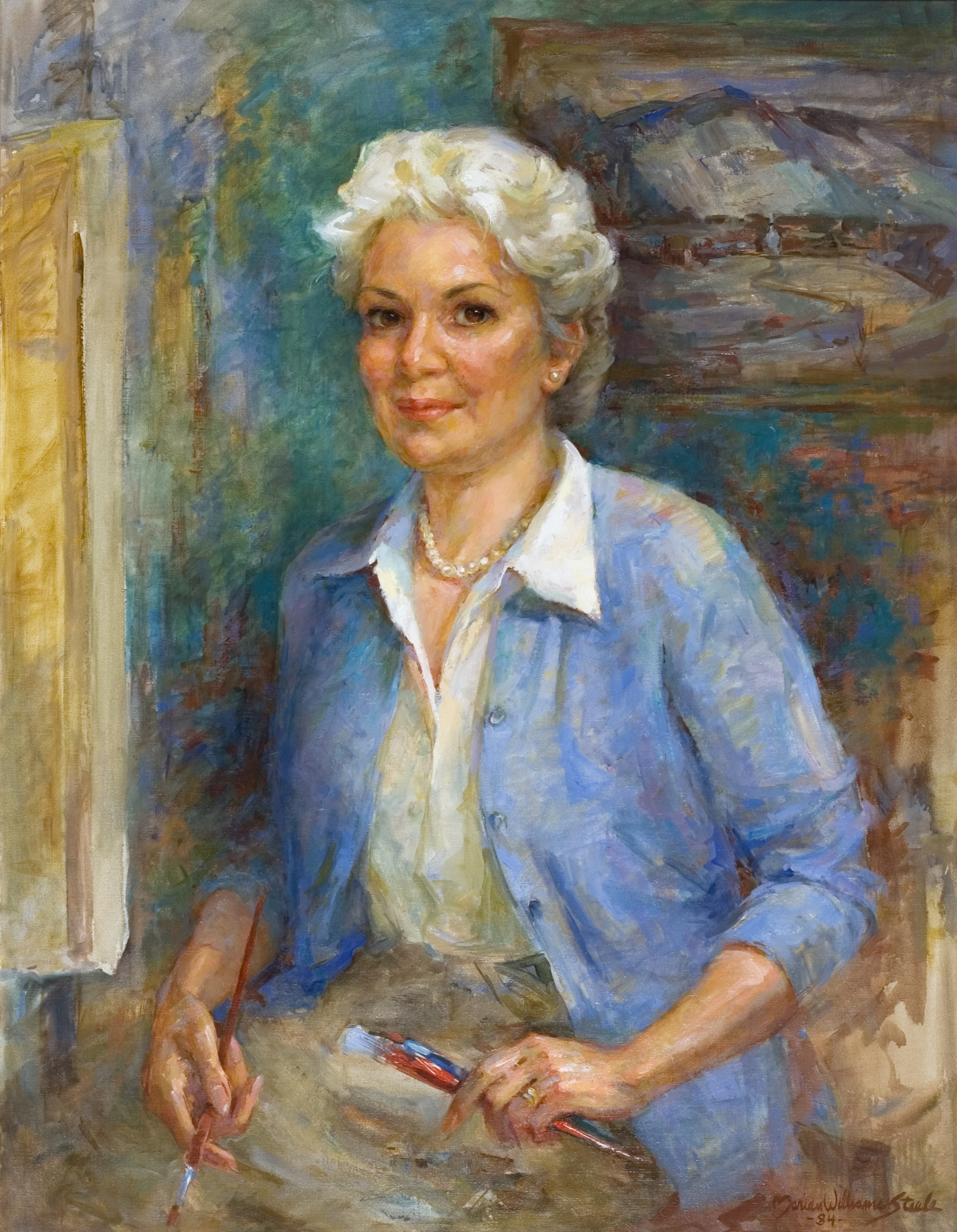
Posthumous portrait of Mary Taylor Bryan by Marian Williams Steele

Mary Bryan was born in Carlsbad, New Mexico, to Florence Hutchins and Frederick E. Lewis II. The family moved to Connecticut soon after, where Mary lived most of her early life, periodically spending time with her father at the Diamond Bar Ranch in California which he founded, before permanently settling in the East with her husband.

Bryan studied with several sculptors including Laura Gardin Fraser, designer of many US coins. After her marriage to Alden Bryan in 1936, she moved to Gloucester, Massachusetts, where the couple spent their summers, and where Mary's career as a painter began. She studied with the artist Emile Gruppe and attended classes with Eliot O'Hara at his School for Watercolor in Goose Rocks Beach, Kennebunkport, Maine.

In 1939, the Bryans attended a winter plein air painting workshop led by Charles Curtis Allen at Jeffersonville, Vermont, an excursion organized by the Rockport Art Association. In 1941, they purchased a home and dairy farm in the area, which became their primary residence for the rest of their lives.

== Artistic style ==
Mary Bryan painted in a variety of artistic media: oil, acrylics, tempera, decoupage, lacquer, ceramic, the fiber arts, in enamels, and at a potter's wheel. However, she was her most masterful painting in watercolor, especially in depicting mountains, oceans, and rural scenes. It was reported by her family that "her hands were never idle and rising early in the morning, she would often be working in her studio before drinking her morning coffee."

== Career and prizes ==
Mary Bryan was a signature member from 1954 to 1978 of the American Watercolor Society. She won three awards at the National Association of Women Artists, two prizes at the Silvermine Guild, three first prizes at the North Shore Art Association and two prizes at the Allied Artists of America, including the Gold Medal of Honor for Best in Show. She was a member of the Guild of Boston Artists and the Copley Society, both in Boston, as well as the Northern Vermont Artists Association. During her lifetime, her work was represented by Grand Central Art Galleries in New York City.

== Death and legacy ==
Mary Bryan died on September 22, 1978, in Chatham, Massachusetts, from cancer. Subsequently, Alden Bryan designed and built Mary Bryan Memorial Gallery, a non-profit exhibit space to exhibit works by artists who traveled to Jeffersonville.

Mary Bryan Memorial Gallery included an indoor studio, kitchen and shower which could be used by traveling artists in need, in addition to a large exhibition space and office. The concept for the gallery included the necessity of exhibiting paintings painted momentarily (and therefore still wet) by artists who might be leaving town within a few days. For his solution, Bryan invented a hanging system (non-patented) that is copied widely to this day with multiple moveable walls to accommodate a frequently changing inventory. In addition to exhibitions, the gallery presented classical music concerts, workshops, and lectures in an annual six-month schedule.

In 1991, the 2,000-square-foot (190 m^{2}) gallery doubled in size to accommodate the ongoing influx of artists and patrons who came to Jeffersonville for artistic purposes. Ultimately, the gallery's schedule expanded to 10 months of the year, offering a series of juried and invitational exhibitions, workshops, demonstrations, artist roundtables and lectures.

Bryan Memorial Gallery continues to exhibit the works of established and emerging Vermont artists and artists who come to Vermont to paint. Both historical and contemporary treatments of the landscape are woven into the themes of eleven exhibitions per year, exploring the vicissitudes of the seasons. Demonstrations and workshops support the passage of technique and insight among artists and patrons, not unlike the workshops in this same area over 100 years ago. Periodically, Bryan Memorial Gallery installs exhibits of Mary's and Alden's works, as solo exhibitions or part of group exhibits, as its contribution to the art historical nature of the area continues.

Mary Bryan is buried next to her husband in the Mountain View Cemetery in Waterville, Vermont.
