= Pseudomyxoma peritonei =

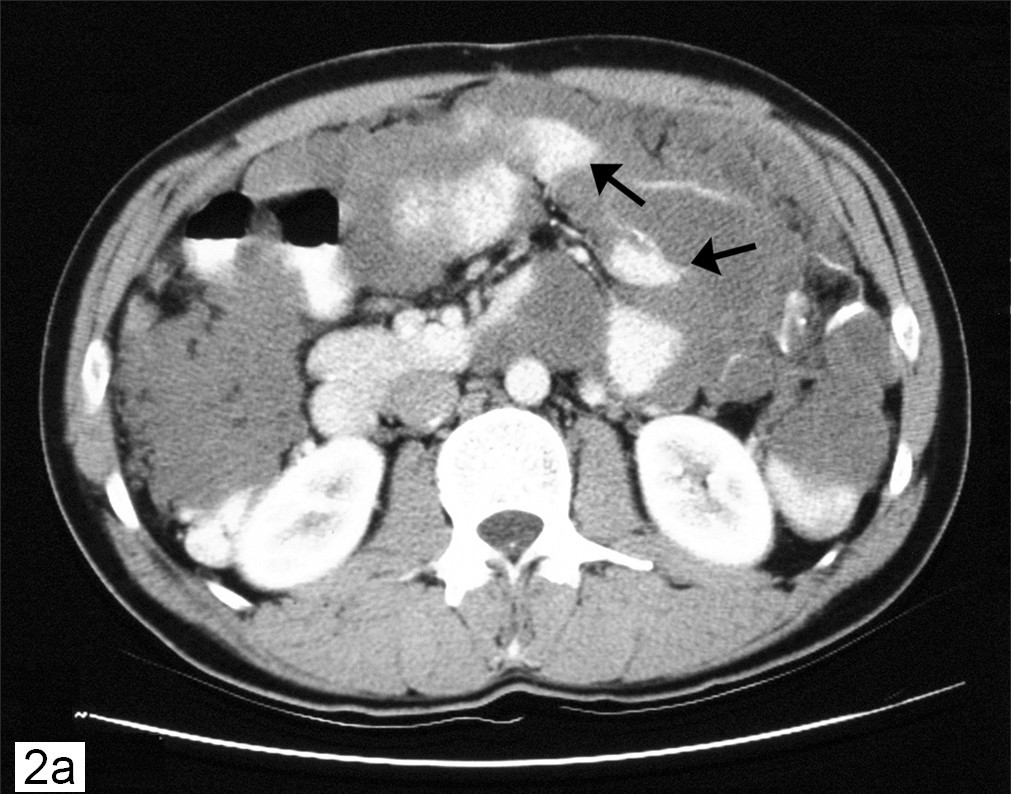
- Computed tomographic scan of an abdomen showing pseudomyxoma peritonei with multiple peritoneal masses (arrow) with "scalloping effect" seen
- Specialty: Oncology

Pseudomyxoma peritonei (PMP) is a clinical condition caused by cancerous cells (mucinous adenocarcinoma) that produce abundant mucin or gelatinous ascites. The tumors cause fibrosis of tissues and impede digestion or organ function, and if left untreated, the tumors and mucin they produce will fill the abdominal cavity. This will result in compression of organs and will destroy the function of the colon, small intestine, stomach, or other organs.

Prognosis with treatment in many cases is optimistic, but the disease is lethal if untreated, with death occurring via cachexia, bowel obstruction, or other types of complications.

This disease is most commonly caused by an appendiceal primary cancer (cancer of the appendix); mucinous tumors of the ovary have also been implicated, although in most cases ovarian involvement is favored to be a metastasis from an appendiceal or other gastrointestinal source. Disease is typically classified as low- or high-grade (with signet ring cells). When disease presents with low-grade histologic features the cancer rarely spreads through the lymphatic system or through the bloodstream.

== Signs and symptoms ==
Signs and symptoms of pseudomyxoma peritonei may include abdominal or pelvic pain and/or bloating, distension, digestive disorders, weight changes, increased girth, and infertility.

== Cause ==
The primary tumor appears to arise from the MUC2-expressing goblet cells and most commonly from these cells in the appendix. The KRAS and p53 genes may be involved in the oncogenesis. It may be diagnosed with a range of conditions. While the majority of these cases are associated with appendiceal carcinomas, other conditions may also be found, including disseminated peritoneal adenomucinosis (DPAM), peritoneal carcinomas, several mucinous tumors (mucinous adenocarcinoma, mucinous cystadenoma, and mucinous cystadenocarcinoma), as well as other disease states. Other primary sites that have been reported include colon, rectum, stomach, gallbladder, bile ducts, small intestine, urinary bladder, lung, breast, fallopian tubes, and the pancreas.

== Diagnosis ==
This disease is often discovered during surgery for other conditions, e.g., hernia repair, following which an experienced pathologist can confirm the diagnosis. Advanced stages may present as tumors palpable on the abdomen or distention of the belly ("jelly belly" is sometimes used as a slang term for the condition).

Due to the rarity of this disease, it is important to obtain an accurate diagnosis so that appropriate treatment may be obtained from a gastrointestinal cancer surgeon. Diagnostic tests may include CT scans, examination of tissue samples obtained through laparoscopy, and the evaluation of tumor markers.

In most cases, a colonoscopy is unsuitable as a diagnostic tool, because, in most cases, appendix cancer invades the abdominal cavity but not the colon (however, spread inside the colon is occasionally reported). PET scans may be used to evaluate high-grade mucinous adenocarcinoma, but this test is not reliable for detecting low-grade tumors, because those do not take up the dye which shows up on scans. New MRI procedures are being developed for disease monitoring, but standard MRIs are not typically used as a diagnostic tool. Diagnosis is confirmed through pathology.

=== Classification ===
There is substantial debate regarding histopathologic classification of pseudomyxoma peritonei. In 1995, Ronnett et al. proposed separating pseudomyxoma peritonei cases into two diagnostic categories: adenoma (disseminated peritoneal adenomucinosis, DPAM) or carcinoma (peritoneal mucinous carcinomatosis, PMCA) with a third category reserved for cases with intermediate features. In this classification system, cases of DPAM were characterized by peritoneal lesions composed of abundant extracellular mucin containing scant simple to focally proliferative mucinous epithelium with little cytologic atypia or mitotic activity (in other words, most cells looked fairly normal and there was no evidence of mitosis which would indicate that cells were rapidly dividing), with or without an associated appendiceal mucinous adenoma. Cases of PMCA were characterized by peritoneal lesions composed of more abundant mucinous epithelium with the architectural and cytologic features of carcinoma (irregular cells, evidence that cells were rapidly dividing, and other criteria), with or without an associated primary mucinous adenocarcinoma. Bradley et al. (2007) argued that continued use of non-malignant terms, i.e., adenoma, for those frequent cases with low-grade features (such as DPAM), is misleading because pseudomyxoma peritonei is a disease state that results from invasion of the abdominal cavity by cells with uncontrolled growth. Bradley states that an adenoma, by definition, is a tumor confined to the appendiceal mucosa with absolutely no evidence of invasion beyond the muscularis mucosae.

The term mucinous adenocarcinoma is used in different contexts depending on the reference material used by the pathologist for disease classification. For example, neoplasms characterized by high-grade features, invasive glands and or signet ring cells, are termed adenocarcinoma in pathology literature. However, some pathologists (e.g., Odze and Goldblum, Surgical Pathology of the GI Tract, Liver, Biliary Tract and Pancreas, 2nd ed.) also use the term mucinous adenocarcinoma when referring to low-grade, well-differentiated tumors lacking high-grade features. Low-grade mucinous adenocarcinoma is used by the American Joint Committee on Cancer and World Health Organization and is nearly or completely synonymous with the DPAM designation. For low-grade mucinous adenocarcinoma, disease may be designated as "benign" because tumors do not invade deeply into tissue and rarely metastasize to parenchyma of organs; this designation may be misleading and confusing to the layperson because pseudomyxoma peritonei is not a harmless condition, fatal if untreated. High-grade or poorly differentiated mucinous adenocarcinoma has a generally poorer prognosis, though surgical treatment with heated intra-peritoneal chemotherapy (HIPEC) is yielding promising outcomes (see surgical treatment).

=== Immunohistochemistry ===
Immunohistochemical features:

1. Diffuse expression of SATB2, CK20, CDX2, and mCEA
2. Sometimes patchy CK7; negative PAX8
3. High-grade neoplasms may show loss of DPC4 (10%)

== Treatment ==
Treatment is variable, both due to its rarity and to its frequently slow-growing nature. Treatment ranges from watchful waiting to debulking and hyperthermic intraperitoneal chemotherapy (HIPEC, also called intraperitoneal hyperthermic chemotherapy, IPHC) with cytoreductive surgery.

=== Surgical ===
The standard of care for mucinous adenocarcinoma with clinical condition PMP involves cytoreductive surgery (CRS) with hyperthermic intraperitoneal chemotherapy (HIPEC), performed by surgical oncologists who specialize in treating PMP. Some surgeons also apply early post-operative intraperitonial chemotherapy (EPIC), adjunct to surgical cytoreduction and HIPEC. In situations where surgery is not required immediately, patients can be monitored via CT scans, tumor marker laboratory tests, and physical symptoms, to determine when, and if, surgery is warranted. Although some surgical procedures may be rather extensive, patients can and do recover from surgery, and the majority of these patients can and do live productive lives. Notably, within the scope of current treatment protocols, patients who cannot receive the CRS-HIPEC standard of care have limited options for alternative avenues of treatment, and further, issues such as tumor recurrence have not been resolved in the CRS-HIPEC treatment. Therefore, continued research on new treatment strategies and how to improve upon current methods is imperative.

In debulking, the surgeon attempts to remove as much tumor as possible. CRS or cytoreductive surgery involves surgical removal of the peritoneum and any adjacent organs which appear to have tumor seeding. Since the mucus tends to pool at the bottom of the abdominal cavity, it is common to remove the ovaries, fallopian tubes, uterus, and parts of the large intestine. Depending upon the spread of the tumor, other organs might be removed, including but not limited to the gallbladder, spleen, and portions of the small intestine and/or stomach. For organs that cannot be removed safely (like the liver), the surgeon strips off the tumor from the surface.

=== Chemotherapy ===
Chemotherapy (typically utilising the chemotherapeutic agent mitomycin C) may be infused directly into the abdominal cavity after cytoreductive surgery (surgery removing all visible disease) to kill remaining microscopic cancerous tumors and free floating cells. The heated chemotherapy (HIPEC) is perfused throughout the abdominal cavity for an hour or two as the last step in the surgery, or ports are installed to allow circulation and/or drainage of the chemicals for one to five days after surgery, known as early postoperative intraperitoneal chemotherapy (EPIC). EPIC may be given in multiple cycles for several months after surgery.

Systemic chemotherapy may be administered as additional or adjuvant treatment. Due to the increased availability of new chemotherapies developed for colorectal cancer patients, some patients have experienced stability in tumor growth with systemic chemotherapy. Systemic chemotherapy is generally reserved for patients with advanced disease, recurrent disease, or disease that has spread to the lymph nodes or distant sites.

This disease may recur following surgery and chemotherapy. Periodic post operative CT scans and tumor marker laboratory tests are used to monitor patients for disease progression.

== Epidemiology ==
The overall incidence was previously estimated at 0.5 to 1 cases per 100,000 people per year. Recent research in Europe indicates that the previous estimate of 1–2 persons per million may be underestimating the actual rate by approximately half, with the real incidence being approximately 3.2 persons per million, and the prevalence being 22 persons per million. It is slightly more common in women than men (male:female ratio of approximately 1:1.3,), although the actual ratio is difficult to identify due to potential misdiagnoses and possibly inclusion bias in reported studies. The median age at presentation is typically about 50 years with a range of 20–25 years, but PMP may strike persons of any age.

== History ==
The first case was described by Carl F. Rokitansky in 1842. Werth in 1884 coined the term pseudomyxoma peritonei, describing it in association with a mucinous ovarian tumor.

In 1901, Frankel described the first case associated with a cyst of the appendix.

Audrey Hepburn died of pseudomyxoma peritonei in 1993.

== See also ==
- Pseudomyxoma Survivor
