= The Cooley Society =

- Formation: 1972
- Region served: Global
- Affiliations: The Texas Heart Institute

The Cooley Society, also known as The Denton A. Cooley Surgical Society, was formed in 1972 by cardiovascular surgeons and fellows of The Texas Heart Institute, in honour of heart surgeon Denton Cooley. The founding president was Philip S. Chua.
