= St. Luke's Texas Liver Coalition =

US health organization

| Established | 1995 |
| Description | Hepatitis C testing & resources |
| Office | Houston, Texas |
| Website | St. Luke's Liver Health Outreach |

St. Luke's Liver Health Outreach is a US non-profit organization for people with liver disease. It is based in Houston, and active throughout Texas. It also provides resources about Hepatitis C, sometimes known as the "silent epidemic".

The organization provides support for patients and their families, as well as public education and awareness activities, an e-mail response program, a toll-free phone number, and a speaker's bureau for lay audiences. It also offers professional, accredited continuing education programs for nurses and counselors. One of the largest of these events is the Annual International Hot Topics in Liver Disease Conference for physicians, nurses, nurse practitioners and physician assistants.

== History ==
St. Luke's Liver Health Outreach was founded in 1995 by Dr. Howard Monsour, a nationally respected researcher and clinician in liver disease, and Austin Jones, a patient. It was incorporated as a 501(c) 3 non-profit organization with the mission to educate, support and comfort people with liver disease and their families. It became a part of the St. Luke's Episcopal Health System in 2002.

Over 5,000 clients have been screened since 2006.
