= Hemopump =

The Hemopump was designed to allow for temporary support of a failing heart. It is a continuous flow pump, and does not need to be synced to the rhythm of the heart. It assists in temporary heart stimulation with conditions such as cardiogenic shock following acute myocardial infarction, heart failure from cardiopulmonary bypass, and more. The pump can continually monitor the left ventricle, which allows for perpetual observation of the hearts condition. This allows for any necessary changes to be made when needed. The pump operates at speeds between two hundred and ninety and four hundred and seventy revolutions per minute.

The Hemopump Cardiac Assist System is an older design intra-arterial, axial-flow pump circulatory assist device concept that offers temporary left ventricular support to patients in refractory cardiogenic shock without requiring major surgery for insertion.

The Hemopump draws blood with the impeller from the left ventricle and then exchanges it through the aorta. It can run at a constant speed, or two variable speeds during the cardiac cycle. Volume of the stroke, the rotating speed, or the pressure can all be tuned. These different setting are used for different conditions of the heart. It is optimal to run at two different speeds through a cardiac cycle as opposed to a constant speed. Running the pump at maximum capacity can be dangerous as it has led to complete collapse of the left ventricle in animal trials.

When in use there was low risk involved with the use of the Hemopump. There have not been many complications in patients that had used the pump. Any complications resulting in morbidity were seen to be rare. The Hemopump was deemed safe for use in community hospitals and it was expected that the number of patients supported by this device would increase. More advanced technologies however did outdate this device making it obsolete.

== Commercial ==
The Hemopump was not successful commercially, however it was a precursor to many technologies that were developed off of the same concepts that were much more successful commercially. Attempts to make a low speed effective pump or LVAD are constantly being researched.

== Hemopump System Components ==
The Hemopump is of axial type, with a length twice that of the diameter. It is placed within a silicone cannula for protection. A steel cable is connected to it which drives it. Lubrication is fed to the pump through a catheter in the drive cable. The pump is inserted through the femoral artery, and then moved up until the tip of the cannula passes over the aortic valve.

The pump is powered by a magnet synchronous motor. The motor has three coils which rotate and create a magnetic field. This receives a signal which can be applied to change the rotational speed. If the rotor is not at the proper signaled speed, it will not rotate at all. It uses a consistent voltage of 24 regardless of frequency. Under operation the motor is operated in a closed loop to avoid accidental stalls.

It will pump up to 3-4 liters per minute of fluid in normal operating range.

== History ==
The pump was designed to allow for temporary support of a dying heart. It is a continuous flow pump, it does not need to be synced to the rhythm of the heart. It assists in temporary heart stimulation with conditions such as cardiogenic shock following acute myocardial infarction, heart failure from cardio pulmonary bypass, and more. The pump can continually monitor the left ventricle, which allows for perpetual observation the hearts condition. This allows for any necessary changes to be made when needed. The pump operates at speeds between two hundred and ninety and four hundred and seventy revolutions per minute.

The pump was first used on 25 April 1988 in a 61 years old man, a recent heart transplant recipient who was in the midst of a profound acute episode of rejection and cardiogenic shock. The pump successfully sustained him for 46 hours while there had

been sufficient recovery of myocardial contractility to redraw the Hemopump support. It was also tested in 1990 on 7 persons with similar heart conditions. The tests were performed by Frazier and Associates.

The pump is not in use anymore, but its design is being applied to other similar devices.
