= Paul Sugarbaker =

American surgeon (born 1941)

Paul Hendrick Sugarbaker (born November 28, 1941, in Baltimore) is an American surgeon at the Washington Cancer Institute. He is known for developments in surgical oncology of the abdomen, including cytoreductive surgery followed by hyperthermic intraperitoneal chemotherapy, or HIPEC, a treatment alternately referred to as the Sugarbaker Procedure.

Sugarbaker is the elder brother of the surgeon David Sugarbaker. Sugarbaker attended high school in Jefferson City, Missouri and received a bachelor's degree from Wheaton College in Illinois in 1963. In 1967 he graduated from the medical college at Cornell University. He interned and did his residency at Peter Bent Brigham Hospital in Boston, serving as chief resident from 1973 to 1976. From 1976 to 1986, he spent ten years at the National Cancer Institute–Surgery Branch of the National Institutes of Health in Bethesda, Maryland, as Senior Investigator. He was also head of surgical oncology at Emory University Medical School, and the medical director of surgical oncology at the Washington Cancer Institute at the MedStar Washington Hospital Center.

== Ovarian cancer ==
Among patients with stage III epithelial ovarian cancer, the addition of HIPEC to interval cytoreductive surgery resulted in longer recurrence-free survival and overall survival than surgery alone and did not result in higher rates of side effects.
