= Denton Cooley =

American heart and cardiothoracic surgeon (1920–2016)

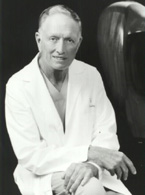
- Born: Denton Arthur Cooley; August 22, 1920; Houston, Texas, US
- Died: November 18, 2016 (aged 96); Houston, Texas, US
- Education: University of Texas at Austin; University of Texas Medical Branch; Johns Hopkins School of Medicine
- Known for: First clinical implantation of a total artificial heart
- Medical career
- Profession: Surgeon
- Institutions: St. Luke's Episcopal Hospital; Texas Children's Hospital; University of Texas Health Science Center at Houston McGovern Medical School
- Sub-specialties: Cardiovascular surgery

Signature
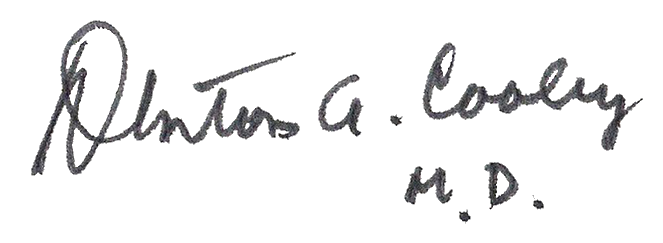

Denton Arthur Cooley (August 22, 1920 – November 18, 2016) was an American cardiothoracic surgeon famous for performing the first implantation of a total artificial heart. Cooley was also the founder and surgeon in-chief of The Texas Heart Institute, chief of Cardiovascular Surgery at clinical partner Baylor St. Luke's Medical Center, consultant in Cardiovascular Surgery at Texas Children's Hospital and a clinical professor of Surgery at McGovern Medical School at the University of Texas Health Science Center at Houston.

== School and early career ==
Cooley was born August 22, 1920, in Houston, and graduated in 1941 from the University of Texas at Austin (UT), where he was a member of Kappa Sigma fraternity and the Texas Cowboys, played on the basketball team, and majored in zoology. He became interested in surgery through several pre-medical classes he attended in college and began his medical education at the University of Texas Medical Branch in Galveston. He completed his medical degree and his surgical training at the Johns Hopkins School of Medicine in Baltimore, Maryland, where he also completed his internship. At Johns Hopkins, he worked with Dr. Alfred Blalock and Vivien Thomas, and assisted in the first "Blue Baby" procedure to correct an infant's congenital heart defect. He is of Irish descent.

In 1946, Cooley was called to active duty with the Army Medical Corps and served as chief of surgical services at the station hospital in Linz, Austria. He was discharged in 1948 with the rank of captain and returned to complete his residency at Johns Hopkins, where he remained as an instructor in surgery. In 1950, he went to London to work with Russell Brock at the Royal Brompton Hospital.

== Major career events ==
In the 1950s, Cooley returned to Houston to become associate professor of surgery at Baylor College of Medicine and to work at its affiliate institution, The Methodist Hospital. Cooley began working with American cardiac surgeon, scientist, and medical educator Michael E. DeBakey. During this time, he worked on developing a new method of removing aortic aneurysms, the bulging weak spots that may develop in the wall of the artery.

In 1960, Cooley moved his practice to St. Luke's Episcopal Hospital while continuing to teach at Baylor. In 1962, he founded The Texas Heart Institute with private funds and, following a dispute with DeBakey, resigned his position at Baylor in 1969.

His skill as a surgeon was demonstrated by successfully performing numerous bloodless open-heart surgeries on Jehovah's Witnesses patients beginning in the early 1960s.

He and his colleagues worked on developing new artificial heart valves from 1962 to 1967. During that period, mortality for heart valve transplants fell from 70% to 8%. In 1969, he became the first heart surgeon to implant an artificial heart designed by Domingo Liotta in a man, Haskell Karp, who lived for 65 hours. The next year, in 1970, "he performed the first implantation of an artificial heart in a human when no heart replacement was immediately available."

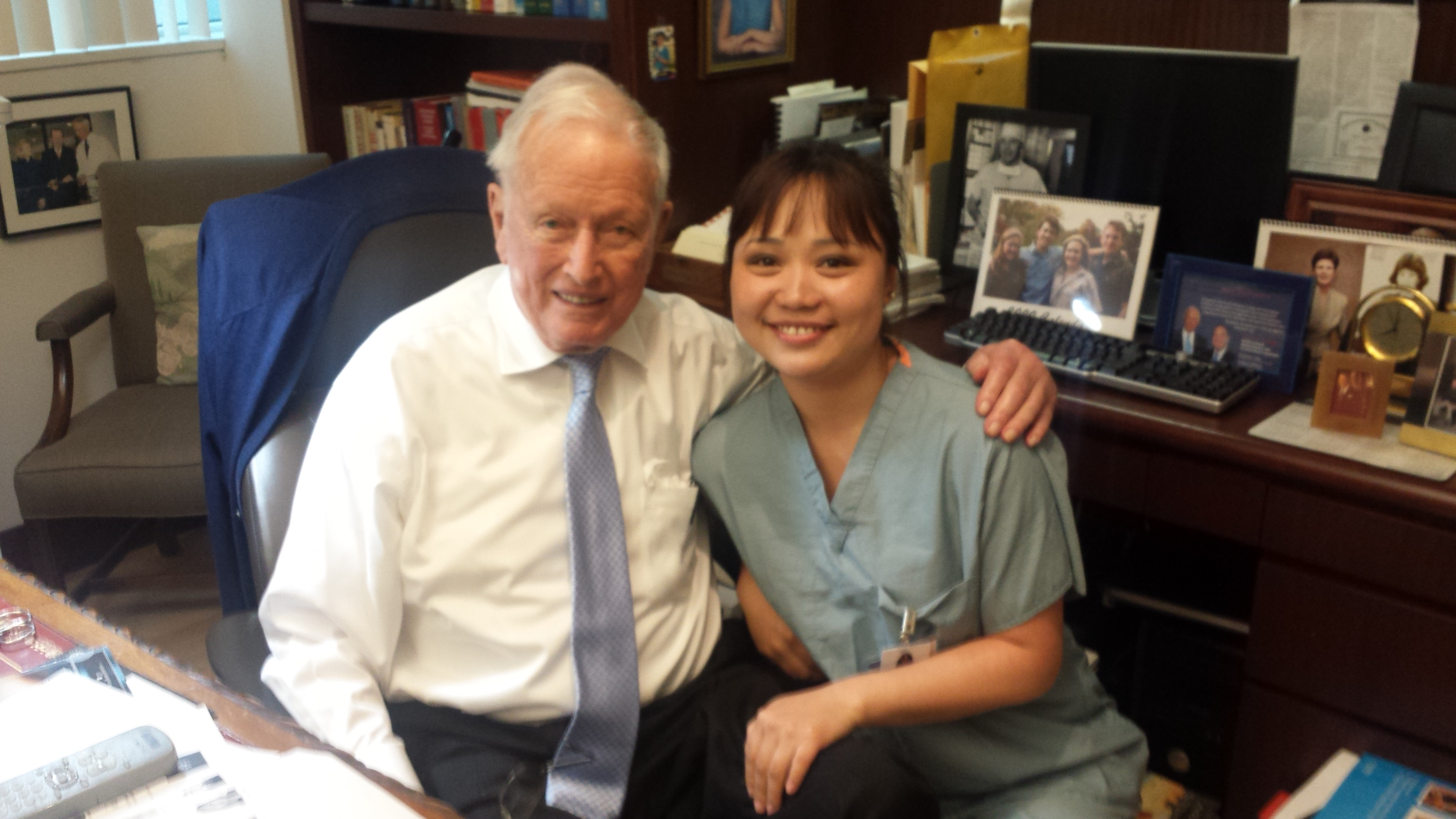
Cooley with a medical student in March 2015

On March 13, 1972, the Denton A. Cooley Cardiovascular Surgical Society was founded at the Texas Heart Institute by the Residents and Fellows of Cooley to honor him. Founding President Philip S. Chua had envisioned this exclusive society to foster academic, professional, and personal camaraderie among cardiac surgeons in the United States and around the world through scientific seminars and symposia. There are now more than 900 cardiac surgeons from more than 50 countries around the globe who are members of the Denton A. Cooley Cardiovascular Surgical Society. In the HBO film Something the Lord Made, Cooley was portrayed by Timothy J. Scanlin, Jr.

During the 2000 U.S. presidential election, then-candidate George W. Bush asked Cooley to review vice-presidential candidate Dick Cheney's medical records, particularly concerning the status of his chronic heart condition.

== Personal life ==
Cooley's interests included basketball, which he played in high school and as a three-year letterman for the UT men's basketball team (1939–1941), and golf, which he became interested in during his youth and played for 68 years. The practice and training facility of the UT men's and women's basketball teams, the Denton A. Cooley Pavilion, which opened in 2003, was named in his honor. Among his other outside interests, Cooley played upright bass in a swing band called The Heartbeats from 1965 through the early 1970s.

Cooley reportedly answered in the affirmative when a lawyer during a trial asked him if he considered himself to be the best heart surgeon in the world. "Don't you think that's being rather immodest?” the lawyer replied. "Perhaps," Cooley responded. "But remember I'm under oath."

Cooley filed for bankruptcy in 1988, citing real estate debts during a market downturn.

Cooley and the heart surgeon Michael E. DeBakey had a professional rivalry that lasted more than 40 years; they made amends in a public rapprochement in 2007, when DeBakey was 99 years old and Cooley was 87. Cooley died on November 18, 2016, at the age of 96.

== Honors and awards ==
- Awarded the Golden Plate Award of the American Academy of Achievement in 1968.
- Awarded the Theodore Roosevelt Award in 1980.

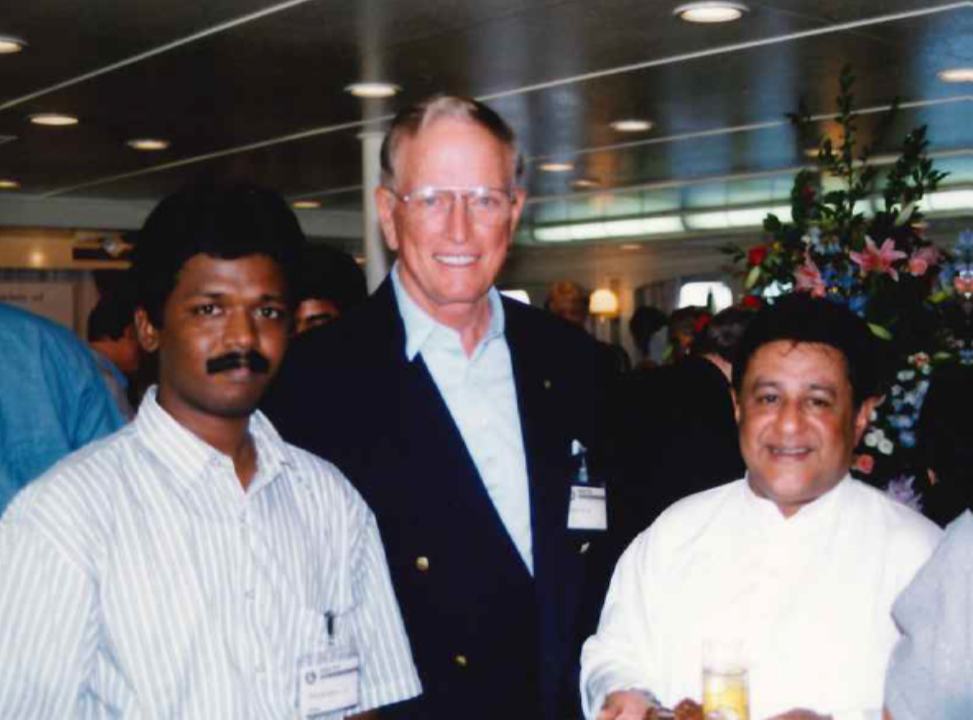
Dr. Samuel JK Abraham, Dr. Denton Cooley, Dr. K.M.Cherian at WSCTS, Hiroshima, Japan in 1996

- Awarded the Presidential Medal of Freedom by Ronald Reagan in 1984, the nation's highest civilian award
- The 1967 René Leriche Prize, the highest honor of the International Surgical Society
- Awarded the National Medal of Technology by Bill Clinton in 1998
- Awarded the Grand Hamdan International Award - Cardiovascular Medicine and Surgery by Hamdan Medical Award in 2000.
- He was a member of the Serbian Academy of Sciences and Arts in the Department of Medical Sciences.
