= Mary Bryan (poet) =

English Romantic poet and novelist (1780–1838)

Mary Bryan (1780–1838) was an English Romantic poet and novelist. Her works include the novel Longhollow; a Country Tale (1829) and the poetry collection Sonnets and Metrical Tales (1815). Bryan was also a correspondent of William Wordsworth and Walter Scott.

== Life ==
=== Early life ===
Mary Bryan was born Mary Langdon on June 15, 1780, in North Petherton in Somerset, England. Her parents were Edmund Langdon and Mary Ballam. Bryan was the eldest child of her family and had three younger siblings, Anna, Julia, and John Ballam, who appear in some of her poems.

=== First marriage ===
On Mary 30, 1804, Bryan married Edward Bryan (1779–1814) in Wells, Somerset. Edward Bryan set up a printing and stationery shop in Bristol around the year 1809 and died in 1814. After Edward Bryan's death, the printing firm was operated by Mary Bryan's father under the name Mary Bryan & Co, though the business never became a financial success. Mary and Edward Bryan had six children together. Mary Bryan's surviving letters indicate that Edward may have prohibited her from publishing her writing; she published her first book, Sonnets and Metrical Tales, in 1815, a year after his death.

=== Second marriage ===
On December 22, 1818, Bryan married James Bedingfield (1788–1860), a Bristol Infirmary doctor, in Westminster. The pair wed in secret because Bedingfield's family disapproved of the match. Bryan and Bedingfield then moved to Stowmarket, Suffolk, where Bedingfield had a medical practice.

=== Later life and death ===
In 1829, Bryan published the novel Longhollow; A Country Tale. She died in Stowmarket on September 29, 1838, at the age of 58.

== Literary career ==
=== Influences ===
In Sonnets and Metrical Tales, Bryan points to Wordsworth as an early influence on her poetry.

Also in Sonnets and Metrical Tales, Bryan cites Charlotte Smith as another influence, as a woman who published poetry out of financial necessity, and whose work was also influenced by her financial situation. According to her surviving letters, Bryan's life was one of financial and emotional hardship. These difficulties are reflected in her work, leading the critic Stuart Curran to call Bryan "the poet of Wordsworthian sorrow." Bryan's sisters, Anna and Julia, are possibly the subjects of Bryan's poems "Julia" and "Anna."

=== Reception ===
According to surviving letters written by Bryan, her work was well received by both William Wordsworth and Walter Scott, but never garnered a wide readership during her lifetime.

In an 1818 letter to Scott, Bryan writes, "I have received from Mr Wordsworth and others very soothing testimonies of the quality of some of my compositions: but it is well known that Mr W is not popular enough to give public weight to his opinion. The Public favor is engrosses by a few and, without infringing their right, I confess I think it ought to extend to a few more"

While she was relatively unknown during her lifetime, some modern scholars, such as Sharon Ragaz and Stuart Curran, have taken an interest in Mary Bryan and her work.

=== Bibliography ===
- Sonnets and Metrical Tales (1815)
- Longhollow; A Country Tale (1829, as Mrs. Bryan Bedingfield)
