= Hyperthermic intraperitoneal chemotherapy =

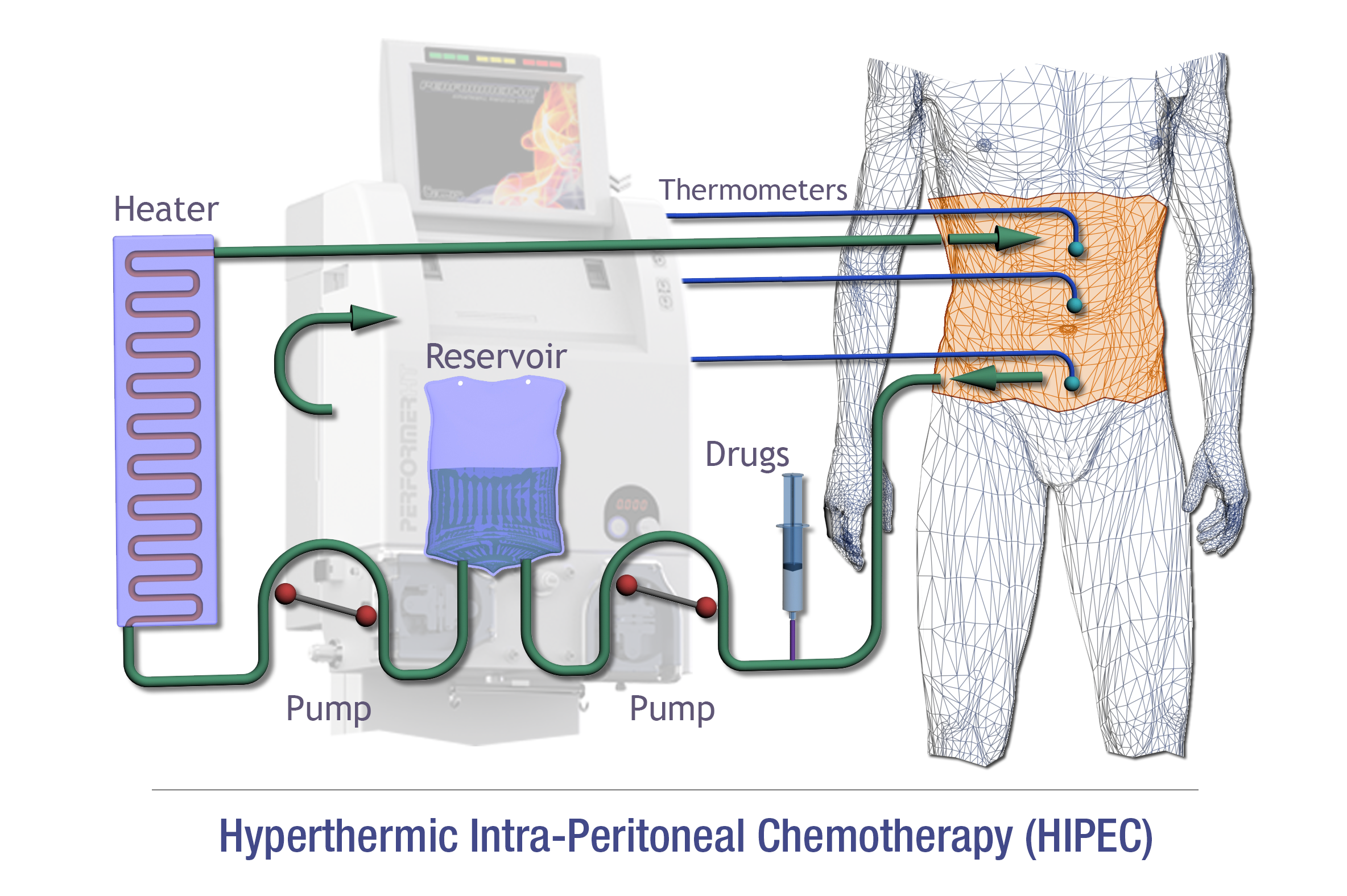
- Schematic overview of HIPEC
- Other names: Intraperitoneal hyperthermic chemoperfusion (IPHC), intra-abdominal hyperthermic chemoperfusion, intraoperative chemohyperthermic peritoneal perfusion (CHPP), or the Sugarbaker technique
- Specialty: Surgical oncology

Hyperthermic intraperitoneal chemotherapy (HIPEC) is a type of hyperthermia therapy used in combination with surgery in the treatment of advanced abdominal cancers. In this procedure, warmed anti-cancer medications are infused and circulated in the peritoneal cavity (abdomen) for a short period of time. The chemotherapeutic agents generally infused during IPHC are mitomycin-C and cisplatin.

== Medical uses ==
IPHC is generally used after surgical removal of as much cancer as possible (debulking), which may include the removal of all involved peritoneal areas. Evidence supports a benefit in certain cases of ovarian cancer.

Evidence is insufficient as of 2020 to support its use in primary advanced epithelial ovarian, fallopian tube or primary peritoneal carcinoma, recurrent ovarian cancer, peritoneal colorectal carcinomatosis, gastric peritoneal carcinomatosis, malignant peritoneal mesothelioma, or disseminated mucinous neoplasm of the appendix.

These procedures can be 8–10 hours long and carry a significant rate of complications.

The chest counterpart of HIPEC is the hyperthermic intrathoracic chemotherapy (HITOC).

=== Chemotherapy agents ===
Various chemotherapies are used and there is no clear consensus on which drugs should be used. Mitomycin C and oxaliplatin are the most commonly used agent for colorectal cancer, while cisplatin is used in ovarian cancer.

== History ==
=== Origins ===
In 1934, Joe Vincent Meigs in New York originally described tumor debulking surgery (cytoreductive surgery) for ovarian cancer under the premise of reducing macroscopic disease. In the 60s and 70s this aggressive cytoreductive approach began to be accepted. During this time, Dr. Kent Griffith at the National Cancer Institute also reported on prognostic indicators of survival in stage II and III ovarian cancer patients, importantly noting that residual tumor mass size (<1.6 cm) after cytoreductive surgery was significantly associated with extended survival. During this time research started to show hyperthermia as well as intraperitoneal chemotherapy was effective in killing cancer cells. Spratt et al. in the 1980s, at the University of Louisville in Kentucky combined these concepts into a thermal transfusion infiltration system (TIFS) for delivery of heated chemotherapy into the peritoneal space of canines. The first human was subjected to TIFS with administration of hyperthermic chemotherapy for locally advanced abdominal malignancy in 1979. Further studies in the 1980s delivered chemotherapeutic agents at concentrations up to 30 times greater than those safely administered via IV route. In the mid to late 1980s, Sugarbaker led the Washington Cancer Institute further investigation into therapy for gastrointestinal malignancies with peritoneal dissemination and was able to report survival benefits. It became apparent early that completeness of cytoreduction was associated with survival benefits. In 1995, Sugarbaker created a stepwise approach to cytoreduction, in an attempt to standardize and optimize this process.

=== "Coliseum" technique ===
The HIPEC technique was also further improved upon by suggesting multiple modalities of delivery. The "Coliseum" technique as well as a similar approach described by Dr. Paul Sugarbaker in 1999 were open abdominal techniques where heated chemotherapy was poured in. Benefits of this open approach included direct access by the surgeon to the cavity during administration of the hyperthermic agents to manipulate the fluid and bowel in order to achieve a quick and homogeneous temperature and distribution of drug within the abdomen. Additionally, care can be taken to ensure that all peritoneal surfaces are exposed equally throughout the duration of the therapy as well as avoid dangerous temperatures or over-exposure to normal tissues. In comparison, the closed technique involves the closure of the abdominal wall prior to infusion of the chemotherapy reducing the issue of heat loss from peritoneal surfaces. In attempts to combine potential advantages of these two techniques, Sugarbaker employed a semi-open method by developing a new containment instrument (Thompson retractor) described in 2005 to support watertight elevation of the abdominal skin edges. More recently, a laparoscopic approach for CRS with HIPEC in highly selected patients with minimal disease burden has been described.

=== Laparoscopy-enhanced HIPEC ===
A further advance was made in 2016, when Lotti M. et al. described a new technique, the laparoscopy-enhanced HIPEC (LE-HIPEC) technique, in which the hyperthermic chemotherapy is delivered after the closure of the abdominal wound, and a laparoscopic approach is used to stir the abdominal content during the perfusion. Lotti M called into question the statement that the Coliseum technique could achieve the homogeneous distribution of heat. The aim of the LE-HIPEC is to achieve a better heat delivery and preservation (as is in the closed technique) and a better circulation of the perfusion fluid (as is in the open technique). Compared to the standard closed-abdomen technique, the LE-HIPEC technique allows the surgeon to open the abdominal compartments to let the inflow of the heated perfusion fluid. Moreover, it allows the identification and division of the early intra-abdominal adhesions that can hamper the circulation of the perfusion fluid during a standard closed-abdomen perfusion.

In a further study, Lotti M et al. showed that after CRS early intra-abdominal adhesions occur in 70% of the patients, soon after the closure of the wound.

== Mechanism ==
Infused chemotherapy diffuses from the intraperitoneal fluid into tissue, interstitial space, and plasma, similar to peritoneal dialysis. The plasma-peritoneum barrier prevents systemic absorption of the chemotherapy into the bloodstream thereby limiting toxicity and side effects. Certain agents, like cisplatin or mitomycin C, are heated to 41 °C-43 °C for an enhanced cytotoxic effect.

=== Anesthetics ===
It has been reported that goal-directed therapy may contribute to individually adjusting fluid therapy and drugs, this might allow to avoid overhydration and to ensure hemodynamic stability.

== Controversy ==
While potentially curative, CRS plus HIPEC is associated with substantial perioperative morbidity and mortality and a short-term decline in the quality of life. Skeptics of this procedure argue there is no multi-centered randomized Phase 3 trial comparing CRS+HIPEC with complete cytoreduction followed by systemic therapy. Hence this therapy has not met the scientific bar to be considered standard of care. However, proponents of CRS+HIPEC argue that until now, there has been no systemic therapy that has provided prolonged survival for peritoneal metastases. Peritoneal metastases, based on the primary tumor and extent of the disease, has a median overall survival of less than 36 months based on systemic therapy alone. The treatment of peritoneal carcinomatosis of colorectal origin with cytoreductive surgery (CRS) plus hyperthermic intraperitoneal chemotherapy (HIPEC) has a 5-year recurrence-free or cure rate of at least 16%.
