= The Texas Heart Institute =

Hospital in Texas, United States

- The Texas Heart Institute at Baylor College of Medicine
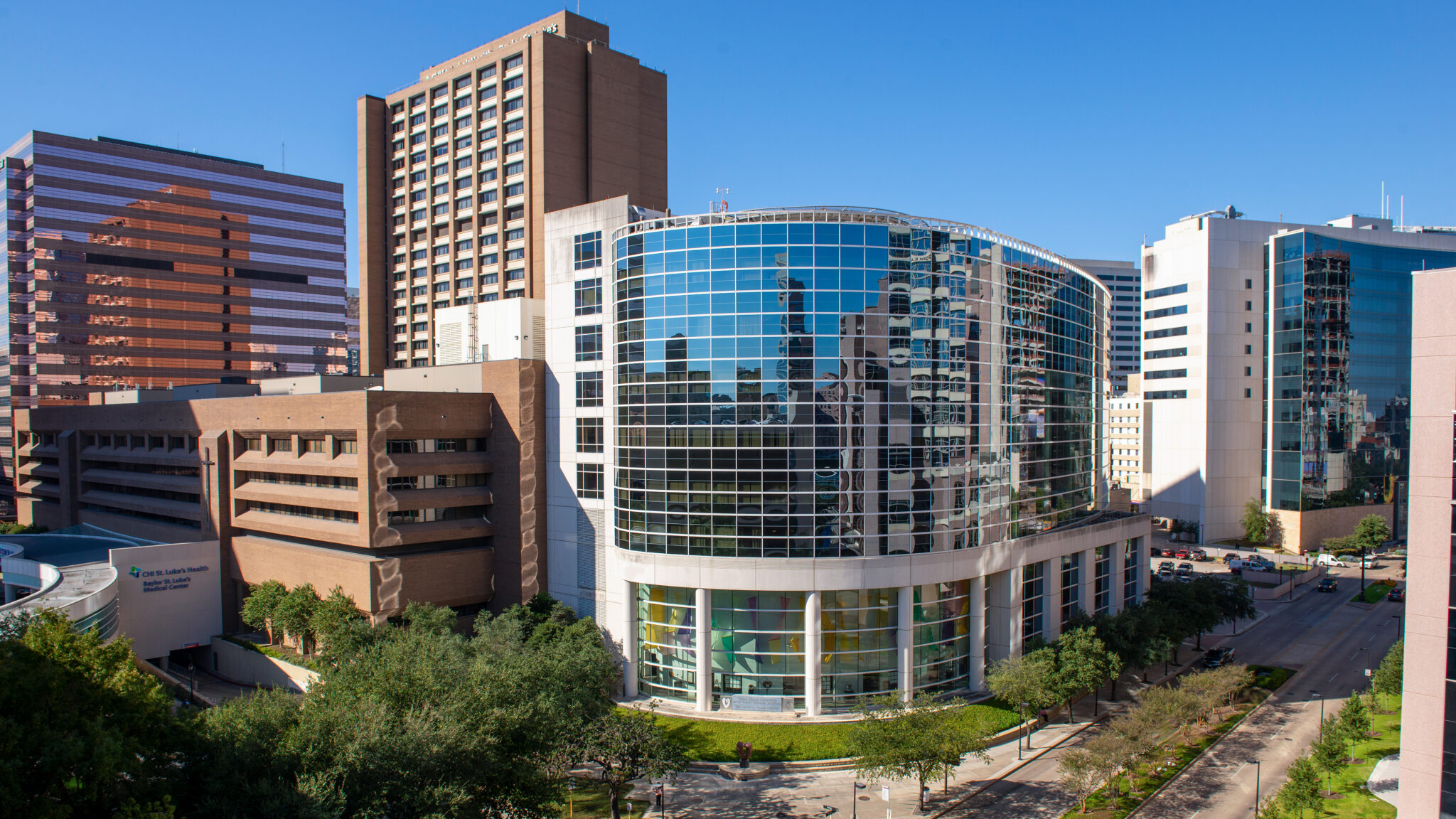
- The Texas Heart Institute located in the Texas Medical Center, Houston, TX
- Established: 1962
- Founder: Dr. Denton A. Cooley
- Coordinates: 29.7081°N 95.3994°W

The Texas Heart Institute, founded by Denton Cooley in 1962, is a nonprofit organization dedicated to reducing the devastating toll of cardiovascular disease through innovative and progressive programs in research, education and improved patient care. The Institute is located within the Baylor St. Luke's Medical Center at the Texas Medical Center in Houston, Texas. In 2024, in its annual survey of “America's Best Hospitals,” U.S. News & World Report ranked the Texas Heart Institute at Baylor St. Luke's Medical Center number 19 in the United States for heart care.

The mission of The Texas Heart Institute is to deliver the future of cardiovascular health through exceptional patient care, discovery, and a commitment to learning.

In November 2024, The Texas Heart Institute and Baylor College of Medicine signed an agreement to form a premier cardiovascular health and research center, uniting two of the nation’s most distinguished programs in cardiovascular medicine. This strategic integration will elevate patient care, accelerate medical research, and bolster education efforts, positioning the organization as an international leader in cardiovascular innovation and clinical care. The integration of these two long-standing affiliates will be known as The Texas Heart Institute at Baylor College of Medicine, and will be led by Dr. Joseph G. Rogers, an internationally recognized cardiologist and highly published thought leader in heart transplantation and mechanically assisted circulation.

== History ==
In the 1950s, Denton Cooley returned to Houston to become associate professor of surgery at Baylor College of Medicine and to work at its affiliate institution, Houston Methodist Hospital. Cooley began working with American cardiac surgeon, scientist, and medical educator Michael E. DeBakey. In 1960, Cooley moved his practice to St. Luke's Episcopal Hospital while continuing to teach at Baylor.

In 1962, he founded The Texas Heart Institute with private funds, including a $5 million grant from the Ray C. Fish Foundation. On August 3, 1962, the institute's charter was officially registered in Austin, the state capital, and a groundbreaking ceremony for the new building expansion occurred on June 26, 1967. Following a dispute with DeBakey, Cooley resigned his position at Baylor in 1969.

The first successful heart transplant in the United States, if survival is measured in months or years rather than hours or days, was performed by Cooley on May 2, 1968, at Baylor. In this instance, a 47-year-old man received the heart of a 15-year-old girl and was alive October 23, 1968 at the time of the worldwide compilation of the earliest heart transplants.

On 4 April 1969, Cooley and Domingo Liotta replaced a dying man's heart with a mechanical heart inside the chest at The Texas Heart Institute in Houston as a bridge for a transplant. The man woke up and began to recover. After 64 hours, the pneumatic-powered artificial heart was removed and replaced by a donor heart. However thirty-two hours after transplantation, the man died of an acute pulmonary infection, extending to both lungs, caused by fungi, most likely due to an immunosuppressive drug complication.

The first School of Perfusion Technology was established in the US and remains one of the few accredited programs of its kind in the country. The Cardiovascular Surgery Research Laboratories were established in 1972 to advance the understanding and treatment of cardiovascular disease. The labs have collaborated with government agencies and biomedical companies to conceive, design, test and apply new treatments, techniques and devices to improve patient care.

The first issue of the Cardiovascular Diseases: Bulletin of the Texas Heart Institute was published in 1974, now called The Texas Heart Institute Journal. Historically, The Journal was printed under the name of Cardiovascular Diseases from 1974 through 1981 (ISSN 0093-3546). The name was changed to Texas Heart Institute Journal in 1982 and was printed through 2013 (ISSN 0730-2347). In 2014, The Journal moved to online-only publication and changed to The Texas Heart Institute Journal in 2023. The Journal is indexed by Index Medicus/MEDLINE and by other indexing and abstracting services worldwide. The full archive is available at PubMed Central.

The Texas Heart Institute, led by O. H. Frazier, a heart surgeon and director of cardiovascular surgery research at The Texas Heart Institute, performed the first bridge-to-transplant procedure using a left ventricular assist device in 1978 in a 21-year-old man who developed ischemic ventricular contracture ("stone heart" syndrome) immediately. Frazier continued experimental work toward developing implantable devices to aid failing hearts.

In 2011, Frazier implanted the first successful continuous-flow total artificial heart using two second generation HeartMate II LVADs to replace a patient's failing heart.

On July 9, 2024, The Texas Heart Institute led the successful first-in-human implantation of the BiVACOR total artificial heart as part of a U.S. Food and Drug Administration early feasibility study . BiVACOR's device is a titanium-constructed biventricular rotary blood pump with a single moving part that utilizes a magnetically levitated rotor that pumps the blood and replaces both ventricles of a failing heart. The first-in-human clinical study aims to evaluate the safety and performance of the BiVACOR total artificial heart as a bridge-to-transplant solution for patients with severe biventricular heart failure or univentricular heart failure in which left ventricular assist device support is not recommended.
