= Domingo Liotta =

Argentine surgeon (1924–2022)

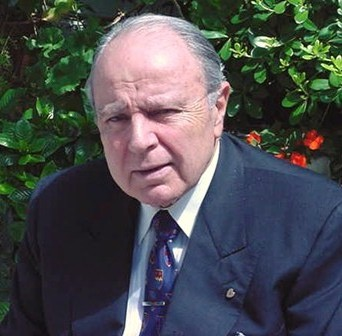
- Liotta in 2007
- Born: 29 November 1924; Diamante, Entre Rios, Argentina
- Died: 31 August 2022 (aged 97)
- Education: National University of Córdoba

Domingo Santo Liotta (29 November 1924 – 31 August 2022) was an Argentine surgeon and pioneer of heart surgery who created multiple cardiac prostheses, including the first total artificial heart.

== Early life ==
Domingo Santo Liotta, the son of Italian immigrants, was born in the city of Diamante, Entre Rios, Argentina on 29 November 1924. He completed his primary education at his hometown at "Independencia School", and his secondary education at the "Justo Jose de Urquiza School" in Concepcion del Uruguay, Entre Rios.

== Medical education highlights ==
In 1949, he graduated as an MD at National University of Córdoba. He received a doctorate in Medicine and Surgery in 1953. In 1955, he developed a technique for early diagnosis of tumors in the pancreas and ampulla of Vater (Pour le diagnostic des tumeurs du pancreas: La duodéno graphie hypotonique. Lyon Chirurgical, 1955). Liotta continued his medical career at the University of Lyon, France, at the "Pierre Mallet-Guy's" General Surgery Service. Then, he trained in thoracic and cardiac surgery, with Professors Paul Santy and Pierre Marion in Lyon. His early works in the artificial heart are from 1958 in Córdoba, where he developed an early prototype successfully used in small animals. After publishing the results of his studies, Liotta was hired at Baylor College of Medicine in Houston, Texas as Director of the Artificial Heart Program by Michael E.Bakey in 1961.

In 1963, Liotta and E. Stanley Crawford first used the Left Ventricular Assist Device (LVAD) in a patient. The original clinical prototype is displayed at the Smithsonian Institution, Washington, D.C. The Liotta-DeBakey LVAD was first used in 1966. 1969 saw the first clinical use of the Liotta-Cooley Total Artificial Heart, at the Texas Heart Institute, Houston, Texas. According to DeBakey, this device was stolen from his lab by Liotta, (even though it was invented by Liotta himself). DeBakey said that the device had not been successful in animal experiments, so while the patient had the artificial heart in place, he developed multiple system organ failure, as supposedly the experimental animals had, and died shortly after a heart replaced the device. However, this proved for the first time that human life could be prolonged with such a device.

== Legacy ==
Liotta was a member of medical societies around the world. He owned 12 patents in the USA, Argentina and France. He was the author of hundreds of scientific publications and scientific books, including medical humanism books in English and Spanish. As Secretary of Health he signed agreements with Chinese Premier Zhou Enlai and Israeli President Ephraim Katzir. Liotta continued to actively work in research and development of new models of heart assist devices.

Liotta died on 31 August 2022, at the age of 97.
