= Debulking =

Procedure carried out to remove the bulk of a tumor

Debulking is the reduction of as much of the bulk (volume) of a tumour without the intention of a complete eradication. It is usually achieved by surgical removal. When performed for curative intent, it is a different procedure, which is called surgical debulking of tumors is known as cytoreduction or cytoreductive surgery (CRS); "cytoreduction" refers to reducing the number of tumor cells. Debulking is used with curative intent in only some types of cancer, as generally partial removal of a malignant tumor is not a worthwhile intervention for curative purposes (because malignant cells left behind soon multiply and renew the threat). Ovarian cancer and some types of brain tumor are debulked before radiotherapy or chemotherapy begin, making those therapies more effective. It may also be used in the case of slow-growing tumors to shift tumor cells from the phase of the cell cycle to the replicative pool.

In other types of cancer where debulking is not curative, it is sometimes done with palliative intent to relieve mass effect. For example, tumors whose bulk presses on the lungs or esophagus can impair breathing or swallowing, in which case debulking can improve quality of life and extend survival regardless of not curing the cancer.

Debulking procedures are usually long and complex, taking several hours or more to perform, depending on the extent of internal involvement and location.
