= Baylor St. Luke's Medical Center =

- Baylor College of Medicine; St. Luke's Health
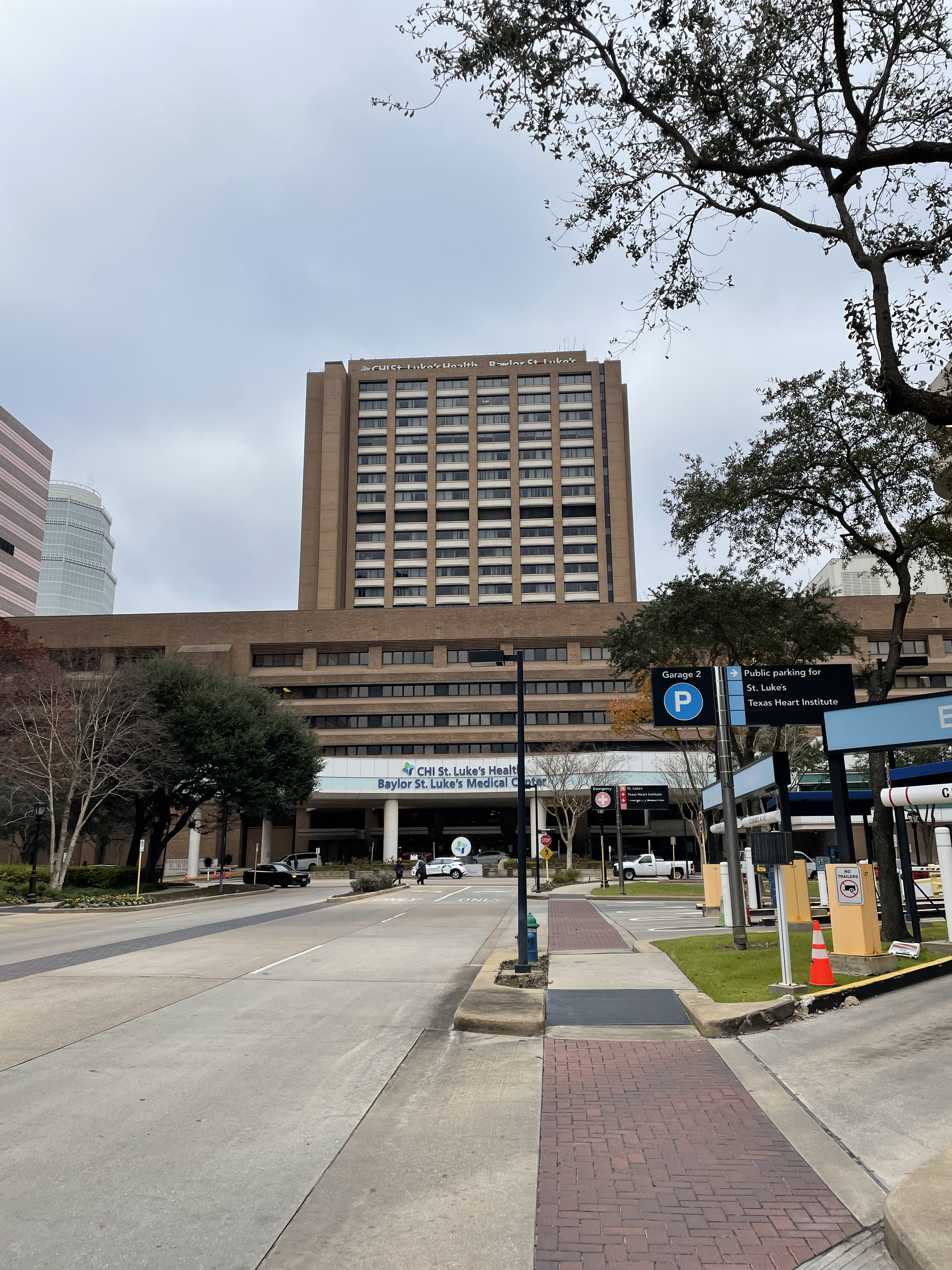

Geography
- Location: 6720 Bertner Avenue, Texas Medical Center, Houston, Texas, United States
- Coordinates: 29°42′28″N 95°24′01″W

Organization
- Care system: Private
- Type: Teaching
- Religious affiliation: Catholic
- Affiliated university: Baylor College of Medicine

Services
- Emergency department: Yes
- Beds: 881 Licensed

History
- Former name: St. Luke's Episcopal Hospital
- Founded: 1954

Links
- Website: https://locations.stlukeshealth.org/location/baylor-st-lukes-medical-center
- Lists: Hospitals in Texas

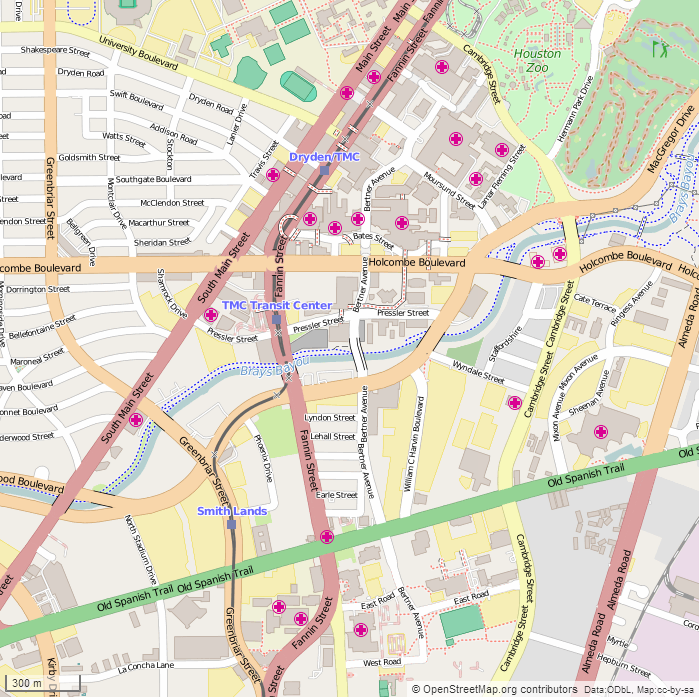
Location within Texas Medical Center

Baylor St. Luke's Medical Center (BSLMC) is the private adult teaching hospital of Baylor College of Medicine jointly owned with St. Luke's Health. The medical staff at the hospital includes full-time Baylor faculty, as well as community physicians. The hospital was formerly known as St. Luke's Episcopal Hospital before its acquisition by Catholic Health Initiatives in 2013 and subsequent co-ownership agreement with Baylor in 2014. It is located on Bertner Avenue in the Texas Medical Center in Houston. The hospital is an 881-bed institution that is also a clinical partner of the Texas Heart Institute.

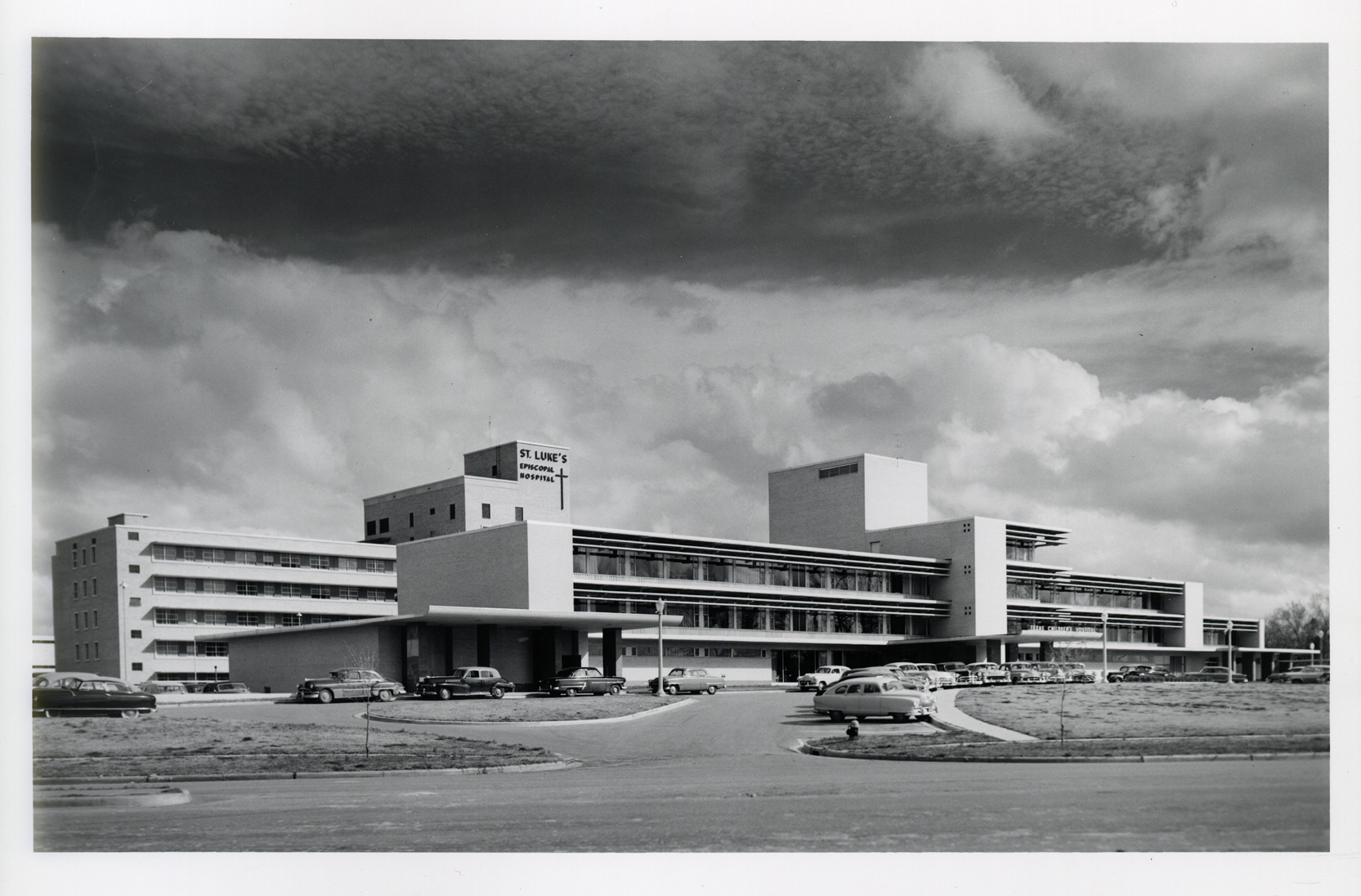
St. Luke's Episcopal Hospital and Texas Children's Hospital in the 1950s

== History ==
The hospital was originally chartered as a 180-bed, non-profit, general hospital in 1945. The charter increased to 300 beds within the first decade, and eventually to 850 beds. In 1962, the hospital affiliated with the Texas Heart Institute (THI). In 1997, the hospital was established as the flagship hospital for the Episcopal Diocese of Texas, as part of the non-profit St. Luke's Episcopal Health System (SLEH). In 2004, SLEH entered into an agreement with the Baylor College of Medicine (BCM) to become its primary adult teaching hospital. In 2013, the hospital was acquired as part of the Catholic Health Initiatives $2 billion purchase of the St. Luke's Episcopal Health System. The health system was renamed as CHI St. Luke's Health System, and the flagship hospital renamed as St. Luke's Medical Center.

In January 2014, BCM and CHI St. Luke's Health agreed to be joint owners of St. Luke's Medical Center. The hospital was accordingly renamed as the Baylor St. Luke's Medical Center (TMC campus). The original Baylor College of Medicine Medical Center building on the McNair campus—unfinished and used primarily as an outpatient center at the time—was also agreed on to become a part of the joint ownership, and will be called the Baylor St. Luke's Medical Center (McNair campus) once completed, initially with 250 beds. The McNair campus also has an outpatient component, which Baylor owns and operates independently. T. Douglas Lawson serves as the current president of the Baylor St. Luke's Medical Center.

== Services ==
Advanced treatment programs offered at Baylor St. Luke's Medical Center include orthopedics, oncology, urology, digestive disorders, cardiac services and neurosciences. Baylor physicians conduct research at the hospital, including running clinical trials while offering early access to experimental treatments and other resources.

The hospital in conjunction with the Texas Heart Institute has performed more than 100,000 open heart procedures, more than 200,000 cardiac catheterizations, and more than 25,000 cardiology interventions as an alternative to bypass surgery since its inception. With more than 10,000 diagnostic and therapeutic procedures performed each year, THI is consistently ranked as one of the leading institutions in the country for cardiovascular care. Baylor physicians also provide care at the Transplant Center, one of the largest in the world, where more than 1,450 heart transplantation's have been performed since 1975.

== Rankings ==
U.S. News & World Report routinely names St. Luke's as one of its “Best Hospitals in Texas”. In 2021 where it was ranked number three in Texas and number two in Houston. St. Luke's is nationally ranked in five specialties and designated high performing in two additional specialties, as well as in 13 procedures and conditions.

== Notable births ==
- Chukwu octuplets, a set of octuplets born to Nkem Chukwu and Iyke Louis Udobi in December 1998
