= Ramucirumab =

Pharmaceutical drug

Monoclonal antibody
- Type: Whole antibody
- Source: Human
- Target: VEGFR2 (KDR)

Clinical data
- Trade names: Cyramza
- Other names: LY3009806, IMC-1121B
- AHFS/Drugs.com: Monograph
- MedlinePlus: a614026
- License data: US DailyMed: Ramucirumab
- Routes of administration: Intravenous infusion
- Drug class: Antineoplastic
- ATC code: L01FG02 (WHO)

Legal status
- Legal status: AU: S4 (Prescription only); CA: ℞-only; US: ℞-only; EU: Rx-only

Identifiers
- CAS Number: 947687-13-0
- DrugBank: DB05578
- ChemSpider: none
- UNII: D99YVK4L0X

Chemical and physical data
- Formula: C_{6374}H_{9864}N_{1692}O_{1996}S_{46}
- Molar mass: 143609.63 g·mol^{−1}

Ramucirumab, sold under the brand name Cyramza, is a fully human monoclonal antibody (IgG1) used for the treatment of cancer. Ramucirumab is a human vascular endothelial growth factor receptor 2 (VEGFR2) antagonist. Ramucirumab was developed by ImClone Systems.

== Medical uses ==
Ramucirumab is indicated for the treatment of gastric cancer, colorectal cancer, non-small cell lung cancer, and hepatocellular carcinoma.

== Contraindications ==
Under the European Union approval, NSCLC therapy with ramucirumab is contraindicated when there is tumor cavitation, or if major vessels are involved.

== Side effects ==
The most common adverse effects in a study investigating ramucirumab monotherapy were diarrhea (14% of patients, as compared to 9% under placebo), hyponatraemia (low blood sodium levels; 6% versus 2%), headache (9% versus 3%), and high blood pressure (16% versus 8%).

== Pharmacology ==
=== Mechanism of action ===
Ramucirumab is a direct VEGFR2 antagonist, that binds with high affinity to the extracellular domain of VEGFR2 and block the binding of natural VEGFR ligands (VEGF-A, VEGF-C and VEGF-D). These ligands are secreted by solid tumors to promote angiogenesis (formation of new blood vessels from pre-existing ones) and enhance tumor blood supply. Binding of ramucirumab to VEGFR2 leads to inhibition of VEGF-mediated tumor angiogenesis.

== History ==
In April 2014, the US Food and Drug Administration (FDA) approved ramucirumab as a single-agent treatment for advanced gastric cancer or gastro-esophageal junction (GEJ) adenocarcinoma after prior treatment with fluoropyrimidine- or platinum-containing chemotherapy. The approval was based on the results of the REGARD trial, a phase III, international, randomized, double-blind, placebo-controlled study, that evaluated the safety and efficacy of ramucirumab combinated with best supportive care versus placebo. This trial has been criticised for its use of a placebo control arm, which does not reflect standard of care in most Western countries.

Ramucirumab has also been studied in combination with paclitaxel (a type of chemotherapy) and received additional FDA approval on 5 November 2014 as a treatment for people with advanced gastric cancer or GEJ adenocarcinoma after prior treatment with fluoropyrimidine- or platinum-based chemotherapy. The approval was based on the results of the RAINBOW trial, that compared ramucirumab plus paclitaxel or paclitaxel alone.

In December 2014, the FDA approved ramucirumab in combination with docetaxel for treatment of metastatic non-small-cell lung carcinoma (NSCLC) with disease progression during or after first-line platinum-containing chemotherapy. The approval was based on REVEL trial.

In April 2015, ramucirumab was approved by FDA for the treatment of people with metastatic colorectal cancer with disease progression on or after prior therapy with bevacizumab, oxaliplatin, and fluoropyrimidine. The approval was based on the results of the RAISE trial, a phase III study, which compared ramucirumab plus irinotecan, folinic acid, and 5-fluorouracil (FOLFIRI) to FOLFIRI alone.

In May 2019, ramucirumab was approved by FDA as a single agent treatment for hepatocellular carcinoma (HCC) in people who have an alpha fetoprotein (AFP) of > 400 ng/mL and have been previously treated with sorafenib. The approval was based on REACH-2 (NCT02435433), a multinational, randomized, double-blind, placebo-controlled, multicenter study in participants with advanced HCC with AFP > 400 ng/mL who had disease progression on or after sorafenib or who were intolerant. The estimated median overall survival (OS) was 8.5 months (7.0-10.6 months) for participants receiving ramucirumab and 7.3 months (5.4-9.1 months) for those receiving placebo.

=== Clinical trials ===
In September 2013, the manufacturer Eli Lilly announced that its phase III study for ramucirumab failed to hit its primary endpoint on progression-free survival among women with metastatic breast cancer.

In June 2014, a phase III trial of the drug reported it failed to improve overall survival in liver cancer.

In February 2016, it was reported that a phase II trial of adding ramucirumab to docetaxel improved progression-free survival (PFS) compared with docetaxel alone in locally advanced or metastatic urothelial carcinoma. It is being studied in the RANGE phase III trial for this indication.

Between 2016 and 2018, 26 hospitals in Italy conducted a multicenter, randomized, double-blind, placebo-controlled, phase II trial to evaluate the safety and effectiveness of the anti-VEGFR-2 antibody ramucirumab combined with gemcitabine in participants with pretreated pleural mesothelioma. Combining ramucirumab to standard second line gemcitabine significantly improved overall survival after failure of first-line chemotherapy, with a favorable safety profile.
