= FOLFOXIRI =

Chemotherapy regimen for advanced colorectal cancer treatment

FOLFOXIRI is a chemotherapy regimen for the treatment of advanced colorectal cancer. The role of FOLFOXIRI in colorectal cancer has been reviewed.

The chemotherapy regimen is made up of the following four drugs:

- FOL – folinic acid (leucovorin), a vitamin B derivative that modulates/potentiates/reduces the side effects of fluorouracil;
- F – fluorouracil (5-FU), a pyrimidine analog and antimetabolite which incorporates into the DNA molecule and stops DNA synthesis;
- OX – oxaliplatin (Eloxatin), a platinum-based antineoplastic agent, which inhibits DNA repair and/or DNA synthesis;
- IRI – irinotecan (Camptosar), a topoisomerase inhibitor, prevents DNA from uncoiling and duplicating.

It is usually given with bevacizumab, unlike FOLFIRINOX for treatment of advanced pancreatic cancer. Also, the doses (Day 1: irinotecan 165 mg/m2 IV, plus oxaliplatin 85 mg/m2 IV; Day 1: leucovorin 400 mg/m2; Days 1–3: fluorouracil 1,600 mg/m2/day × 2 days (total 3,200 mg/m2 over 48 hours) continuous infusion starting on day 1; Day 1: bevacizumab 5 mg/kg IV; repeat cycle every 2 weeks) are slightly dissimilar to FOLFIRINOX.

Upfront FOLFOXIRI with bevacizumab can be followed by fluoropyrimidine with bevacizumab maintenance.

== See also ==
- FOLFIRI
- FOLFOX
- FOLFIRINOX
- IFL
