= Vatalanib =

Chemical compound

Clinical data
- Pregnancy category: None assigned
- Routes of administration: Oral
- ATC code: none

Legal status
- Legal status: Investigational

Pharmacokinetic data
- Bioavailability: High
- Metabolism: Extensive hepatic metabolism (mostly CYP3A4-mediated)
- Elimination half-life: 4.6 ± 1.1 h
- Excretion: Fecal and renal

Identifiers
- IUPAC name: N-(4-chlorophenyl)-4-(pyridin-4-ylmethyl)phthalazin- 1-amine
- CAS Number: 212141-54-3
- PubChem CID: 151194
- IUPHAR/BPS: 5705
- DrugBank: DB04879
- ChemSpider: 133257
- UNII: 5DX9U76296
- ChEBI: CHEBI:90620
- ChEMBL: ChEMBL101253
- CompTox Dashboard (EPA): DTXSID2046919

Chemical and physical data
- Formula: C_{20}H_{15}ClN_{4}
- Molar mass: 346.82 g·mol^{−1}
- 3D model (JSmol): Interactive image
- SMILES: Clc1ccc(cc1)Nc3nnc(c2c3cccc2)Cc4ccncc4
- InChI: InChI=1S/C20H15ClN4/c21-15-5-7-16(8-6-15)23-20-18-4-2-1-3-17(18)19(24-25-20)13-14-9-11-22-12-10-14/h1-12H,13H2,(H,23,25); Key:YCOYDOIWSSHVCK-UHFFFAOYSA-N

Vatalanib (INN, codenamed PTK787 or PTK/ZK) is a small molecule protein kinase inhibitor that inhibits angiogenesis. It is being studied as a possible treatment for several types of cancer, particularly cancer that is at an advanced stage or has not responded to chemotherapy. Vatalanib is orally active, meaning it is effective when taken by mouth.

Vatalanib is being developed by Bayer Schering Pharma and Novartis. It inhibits all known VEGF receptors, as well as platelet-derived growth factor receptor-beta and c-kit, but is most selective for VEGFR-2.

== Development ==
Vatalanib was discovered through high-throughput screening. It has been extensively investigated in Phase I, II and III clinical trials. Two large, randomized controlled Phase III trials have studied the effect of adding vatalanib to the FOLFOX chemotherapy regimen in people with metastatic colorectal cancer: CONFIRM-1, whose participants had not yet received any treatment for their cancer; and CONFIRM-2, in which participants had received first-line treatment with irinotecan and fluoropyrimidines. Vatalanib produced no significant improvement in overall survival (the primary endpoint of the studies), although it did significantly increase progression-free survival in CONFIRM-2. Both trials found that progression-free survival was improved in people with high levels of lactate dehydrogenase, an enzyme used as a marker of tissue breakdown; the reasons for and implications of this difference are still unclear.

== Adverse effects ==
The adverse effects of vatalanib appear similar to those of other VEGF inhibitors. In the CONFIRM trials, the most common side effects were high blood pressure, gastrointestinal upset (diarrhea, nausea, and vomiting), fatigue, and dizziness.

== Notable users ==
Patrick Swayze, a popular actor in the 1980s who starred in such films as Dirty Dancing and Road House was given this drug when he was diagnosed with stage IV pancreatic cancer in 2008. Doctors hoped the drug would cut off blood supply to the tumor. Despite this, Swayze died on September 14, 2009, 20 months after being diagnosed.
