= FOLFIRINOX =

Chemotherapy regimen

FOLFIRINOX is a chemotherapy regimen for treatment of advanced pancreatic cancer. It is made up of the following four drugs:

- FOL – folinic acid (leucovorin), a vitamin B derivative that enhances the effects of 5-fluorouracil (5-FU);
- F – fluorouracil (5-FU), a pyrimidine analog and antimetabolite which incorporates into the DNA molecule and stops DNA synthesis;
- IRIN – irinotecan (Camptosar), a topoisomerase inhibitor, which prevents DNA from uncoiling and duplicating; and
- OX – oxaliplatin (Eloxatin), a platinum-based antineoplastic agent, which inhibits DNA repair and/or DNA synthesis.

The regimen emerged in 2010 as a new treatment for patients with metastatic pancreatic cancer. A 2011 study published in the New England Journal of Medicine found that FOLFIRINOX produced the longest improvement in survival ever seen in a phase III clinical trial of patients with advanced pancreatic cancer, with patients on the FOLFIRINOX treatment living approximately four months longer than patients receiving the standard gemcitabine treatment (11.1 months compared with 6.8 months). However, FOLFIRINOX is a potentially highly toxic combination of drugs with serious side effects, and only patients with good performance status are candidates for the regimen. Currently FOLFIRINOX is being used as a neoadjuvant therapy, meaning to downstage patients with "borderline and locally advanced" disease with the hope of rendering their tumors amenable to surgical resection.

In 2013, the U.S. Food and Drug Administration approved protein-bound paclitaxel (also known as nab-paclitaxel, sold as Abraxane) used with gemcitabine. This regimen may be less toxic though perhaps a less effective alternative to FOLFIRINOX for treating late-stage pancreatic cancer. Differences in the trials, and the lack of a direct trial comparing the two regimens, preclude a final conclusion. In the United Kingdom, the National Institute for Health and Care Excellence (NICE), in a draft guidance issued in 2014, rejected the use of Abraxane in treatment due to concerns of side effects, efficacy, and cost relative to Gemzar (gemcitabine). However, on 18 May 2017 NICE issued a reappraisal for the use of Abraxane in the UK. This was in response to Celgene putting forward a Patient Access Scheme (PAS) proposal, which would bring down the cost of the drug.

== See also ==
- FOLFIRI
- FOLFOX
- FOLFOXIRI
- IFL
