= Metastasectomy =

Surgical removal of cancer metastases

- Specialty: Surgical oncology

In oncology, metastasectomy is the surgical removal of metastases, which are secondary cancerous growths that have spread from cancer originating in another organ in the body.

In many cases, metastases are not treated surgically. There are two common reasons for this. Often, even with a successful surgery, the patient would have a poor prognosis. If the cancer is widely disseminated, it is likely that after the surgical removal of all known metastases, new ones will occur elsewhere. Sometimes, surgery itself has a low likelihood of success due to the location and/or extensiveness of the cancer. If complete surgical excision is feasible, however, removing both the primary cancer and its metastases may substantially improve the patient's prognosis. Some patients may even be cured.

The use of metastasectomy evolved in the field of liver resection for metastasised colorectal cancer, but has evolved to include resection of metastases from different primary cancers (such as breast cancer, melanoma, renal cell carcinoma, etc.) to the lungs, brain, and other organs. Not all of these applications are equally evidence-based, although with respect to some other primary cancers, metastasectomy may be underutilized.

== Liver metastasectomy ==
=== Colorectal cancer ===
Among colorectal cancer patients, 15 to 25% will have liver metastases already when the colorectal cancer is discovered, and another 25 to 50% will develop them in the three years after resection of their primary cancer. Of patients who die from metastasised colorectal cancer, 20% have metastasis in the liver alone.

Surgical resection of liver metastases from colorectal cancer has been found to be safe and cost-effective. Reports from several large retrospective patient series suggest that it has a 5-year overall survival rate (5y OSR) averaging 30 to 40% and a 10y OSR around 16%, whereas the highest 5y OSR for modern chemotherapy regimens is only 9% (with FOLFOX). However, no randomized clinical trial has directly compared surgical management to chemotherapy or treatment with bevacizumab. Some have argued that the excellent results of liver metastasectomy for colorectal cancer are partially confounded by selection bias or reporting bias. Nevertheless, surgery for resectable metastases has become the standard of care, probably making such a trial (ethically) infeasible.

Previously, liver metastasectomy was limited to patients with less than four sites of metastasis in the liver, with a tumour-free margin of at least 1 centimetre, and no cancer elsewhere. These criteria have been challenged, however, and today the main criteria are a tumour-free margin and enough functional liver tissue (70%) preserved after surgery. Patients with initially unresectable liver metastases can be pre-treated with chemotherapy (this is called neoadjuvant chemotherapy). This pre-treatment causes the tumors to shrink, resulting in a larger proportion of liver tissue that is functional, with broader margins.

Preoperative evaluation involves imaging of the liver and its metastases, for example with ultrasound, computed tomography or magnetic resonance imaging. Positron emission tomography can be useful to check the entire body for metastases, although the test can be falsely normal with small lesions or preoperative chemotherapy. Baseline blood tests typically include liver function tests and tumour markers. During surgery, intraoperative ultrasound can aid the surgeon to find additional metastases.

A clinical risk score first proposed by Fong et al. is often used to assess the risk of recurrence after hepatic resection. The score assigns one point to each of the following:

- CEA level >200 ng/ml
- Disease-free interval from primary to metastasis <12 months
- Node-positive primary
- More than one liver metastasis
- Largest hepatic tumor >5 cm

The median survival for each score is:

Fong Score	Median Survival
0	74 months
1	51 months
2	47 months
3	33 months
4	20 months
5	22 months

Despite the score being highly predictive of long-term outcome, the clinical usefulness is often called into question because the chance of long-term survival is often enough to warrant surgery even in cases with high Fong Score. Some researchers have suggested that the Fong Score has become less useful with the advent of more effective neoadjuvant therapy.

== Pulmonary metastasectomy ==
Surgery is the mainstay of treatment for patients with isolated lung metastasis from colorectal cancer. Again, no randomized clinical trials exist, and the scientific evidence is weak, limited only to case series. The surgery can be performed with a low operative mortality.

For patients in whom the primary tumour is controlled and metastases are limited to the lung, criteria for eligibility include the technical resectability of the metastases and the general fitness and lung function reserve of the patient. If there are both liver and lung metastases, a resection of both can be attempted. In general, only 10% of patients with pulmonary metastases from colorectal cancer are resectable.

Blalock reported the first lung resection for metastasis from colorectal cancer in 1944.
