= Omental cake =

Pattern seen in radiologic examinations

- Other names: omental thickening
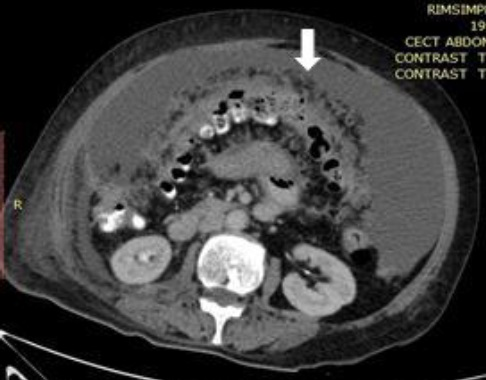
- Axial abdominal computed tomography featuring omental caking due to peritoneal carcinomatosis
- Causes: metastatic cancer, infectious disease
- Diagnostic method: medical imaging

Omental cake is a radiologic sign indicative of an abnormally thickened greater omentum. It refers to infiltration of the normal omental structure by other types of soft-tissue or chronic inflammation resulting in a thickened, or cake-like appearance.

== Causes ==
Typically, it is caused by infiltration of metastatic tumors arising from the stomach, ovary, or colon. This dissemination of cancerous cells that do not originate from the omentum itself is called peritoneal carcinomatosis. It can occur other regional tumors such as lymphoma where it is associated with regional lymphadenopathy. It can also rarely occur as a result of infectious causes such as tuberculous peritonitis, peritoneal coccidioidomycosis, and histoplasmosis.

== Signs and symptoms ==
For the most common cause, peritoneal carcinomatosis, omental caking is associated with a wide variety of symptoms. Ascites and intestinal peristalsis is known to have an effect on how diffusely the cancer cells are spread throughout the abdomen. This wide range of presentation makes omental caking difficult to diagnose based on symptoms alone.

In patients with omental caking due to peritoneal lymphomatosis secondary to cancers such as Non-Hodgkin's lymphoma or MALT lymphoma, the most frequent symptoms encountered are abdominal pain, gastric distention, and weight loss.

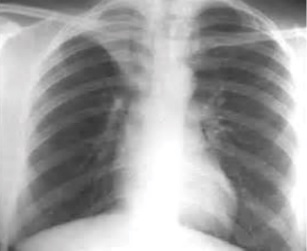
Distinct fibrotic scar and hilar opacity following secondary tuberculosis on chest x-ray

Causes such as bacterial and fungal infections are associated with diffuse abdominal pain, intraperitoneal fluid accumulation, weight loss, fevers, and night sweats. The most common radiographic feature among patients with suspected tuberculous peritonitis was septated compartments of ascitic fluid on ultrasound and abnormal chest X-ray suggestive of previous tuberculosis.

== Diagnosis and treatment ==
Due to the variety of symptoms experienced by patients with omental caking, omental cakes are most frequently discovered on abdominal computed tomography (CT) or ultrasound. Plain film radiography (X-ray) is not a suggested modality for investigating the spread of cancerous cells in the abdomen due to the poor spatial resolution amongst soft-tissue densities. Contrast resolution obtained through CT allows radiologists to investigate omental caking for morphology, intraperitoneal fluid, and regional lymphadenopathy assists in proper diagnosis so clinicians, surgeons, and oncologists can plan the appropriate course of treatment.

After omental cakes have been identified on CT or ultrasound, it may be appropriate to gain more information on the characteristics of the disease by undergoing nuclear medicine scans that can identify tissues where the cancerous cells may have spread or magnetic resonance imaging (MRI) for a higher degree of spatial resolution. Suspected infectious etiologies may require another degree of medical testing including blood antigen or antibody analysis. Yet, in both malignant and infectious cases, image-guided biopsy with pathologic correlation is the most definitive way to confirm the diagnosis.

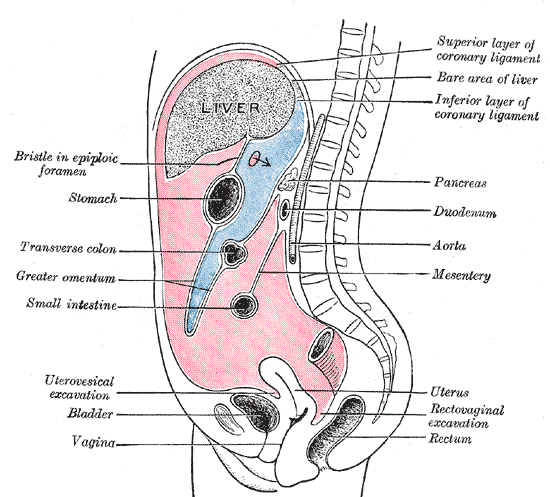
Anatomic illustration of the greater omentum (blue) and its proximity to other peritoneal contents including small intestine, transverse colon, stomach, and liver

The presence of omental cakes have long been seen as an indication of poor prognosis in patients with advanced-stage ovarian or gastrointestinal cancer, and medical teams usually address this through more advanced and aggressive treatments such as cytoreductive surgery and hyperthermic-intraperitoneal chemotherapy (HIPEC). During surgery, the presence of omental caking makes incomplete resection more likely. In patients where omental spread is completely removed, intestinal resections are more likely to be encountered due to the caked omentum's propensity for spreading malignancy to adjacent organs. If malignant, as patients undergo treatment they are likely to undergo routine nuclear medicine imaging as surveillance for response to the treatment or recurrence of disease.

== Mimics ==
Common disease presentations that are different but may appear similar include pseudomyxoma peritonei, peritoneal mesothelioma, splenosis in patients with a history of splenectomy, and diffuse peritoneal leiomyomatosis. These diagnoses should be considered in patients with suspected omental caking and a history that makes malignant or infectious causes less likely. Image-guided biopsy with pathologic correlation is the gold-standard method for distinguishing these entities.

== History ==
Omental cakes have long been described during malignancy-related surgical interventions. In 1985, Drs. Stephen Rubesin and Marc Levine were the first to publish a radiographic review of omental caking and to describe the propensity for omental spread to facilitate colonic metastases due to the proximity of the greater omentum to bowel. Since then, many radiologists have adopted techniques to investigate omental thickening and irregularities in density using the Hounsfield scale and other radiographic tools to determine the extent of abdominal disease.
