= FOLFIRI =

Chemotherapy regimen for colorectal cancer treatment

FOLFIRI is a chemotherapy regimen for treatment of colorectal cancer. It is made up of the following drugs:

- FOL – folinic acid (leucovorin), a vitamin B_{9} derivative with multiple applications, which in this context decreases the cytotoxicity of 5-fluorouracil;
- F – fluorouracil (5-FU), a pyrimidine analog and antimetabolite which incorporates into the DNA molecule and stops synthesis; and
- IRI – irinotecan (Camptosar), a topoisomerase inhibitor, which prevents DNA from uncoiling and duplicating.

== Medical uses ==
FOLFIRI is used for colorectal cancer and gastric cancer. FOLFIRI is effective in the treatment of metastatic colorectal cancer, but it has not been shown to be effective in the adjuvant therapy of colon and rectal cancer.

== Regimen ==
The regimen consists of:

- irinotecan (180 mg/m^{2} IV over 90 minutes) concurrently with folinic acid (400 mg/m^{2} [or 2 x 250 mg/m^{2}] IV over 120 minutes)
- followed by fluorouracil (400–500 mg/m^{2} IV bolus) then fluorouracil (2400–3000 mg/m^{2} intravenous infusion over 46 hours).

This cycle is typically repeated every two weeks. The dosages shown above may vary from cycle to cycle.

=== Combinations ===
FOLFIRI is often combined with bevacizumab, aflibercept, cetuximab or panitumumab to improve efficacy and response rate.

== Adverse effects ==
In the short term, irinotecan causes diarrhea, which may be acute or delayed in onset. Long term use of irinotecan may lead to neutropenia.

== See also ==
- Dose-dense chemotherapy
- FOLFIRINOX
- FOLFOX
- FOLFOXIRI
- IFL
