= MY-5445 =

Names
- Preferred IUPAC name N-(3-Chlorophenyl)-4-phenylphthalazin-1-amine

Identifiers
CAS Number	78351-75-4
3D model (JSmol)	Interactive image
ChemSpider	1308
ECHA InfoCard	100.163.900
EC Number	636-069-4
PubChem CID	1348
UNII	F8CSS73B6A
CompTox Dashboard (EPA)	DTXSID70229009
- InChI: InChI=1S/C20H14ClN3/c21-15-9-6-10-16(13-15)22-20-18-12-5-4-11-17(18)19(23-24-20)14-7-2-1-3-8-14/h1-13H,(H,22,24) Key: CEHQLKSLMFIHBF-UHFFFAOYSA-N; InChI=1/C20H14ClN3/c21-15-9-6-10-16(13-15)22-20-18-12-5-4-11-17(18)19(23-24-20)14-7-2-1-3-8-14/h1-13H,(H,22,24) Key: CEHQLKSLMFIHBF-UHFFFAOYAQ
- SMILES: C1=CC=C(C=C1)C2=NN=C(C3=CC=CC=C32)NC4=CC(=CC=C4)Cl

Properties
Chemical formula	C_{20}H_{14}ClN_{3}
Molar mass	331.80 g·mol^{−1}
- Except where otherwise noted, data are given for materials in their standard state (at 25 °C [77 °F], 100 kPa). Infobox references

MY-5445 is a relatively specific phosphodiesterase 5 inhibitor.

== See also ==
- Vatalanib — a structurally related angiogenesis inhibitor
