= Concomitant drug =

Drug given at the same time as, or shortly after, another drug

Concomitant drugs are two or more drugs used or given at or almost at the same time (one after the other, on the same day, etc.). The term has two contextual uses: as used in medicine or as used in drug abuse.

== Concomitant drugs in medicine ==
This designation is used when medicinal drugs are given either at the same time or almost at the same time. This is often the case in medicine.

Chemotherapy for cancer applies is an example. The standard of care (sometimes also called the "gold standard") for the adjuvant treatment of stage III colon cancer is the FOLFOX chemotherapy protocol (used in Europe, Japan, Canada, and Australia) and respectively the FLOX chemotherapy protocol (used in the USA). These 2 chemotherapy protocols are very similar in principle. Both consist of 3 medicinal drugs: a) Leucovorin (= folinic acid = calcium folinate), b) 5-Fluorouracil (= 5-FU), and c) Oxaliplatin. Since these 3 medicinal drugs are "concomitant" to each other, such a constellation is called "concomitant drugs".

Contrast imaging in medicine is another example. These are imaging procedures in medicine that are performed after giving the patient an iodinated contrast medium (e.g. different types of contrast X-rays, CTs, MRIs). It is well known that such iodinated contrast media can lead to acute allergies in some patients. They may also lead to kidney damage. If the patient is receiving a "concomitant" medicinal drug (prescribed to the patient by another physician), and the radiologist performing the imaging procedure is unaware of this, potentially harmful side-effects can occur and increase the risk of contrast medium-induced nephropathy (i.e. increase the risk of damage to the kidneys). In general, radiologists carefully ask their patients about other medicinal drugs they are "concomitantly" taking before the imaging procedure. Often, they monitor the kidney function and the hydration status of their patients during the imaging procedure, especially whenever a concomitant drug (that is harmful to the kidney) is being used.

== Concomitant drugs in drug abuse ==
If a drug abuser ingests or misuses two or more drugs, either at the same time or almost at the same time, this is also called "concomitant drugs".

Whether concomitant drug abuse leads to an increased number of deaths was scientifically analysed in Sheffield, UK. The researchers wanted to find out whether concomitant drug abuse (i.e. an opiate plus another drug of misuse) leads to an increased number of acute accidental opiate-related deaths. The authors showed that at least in the Sheffield area, intravenous (IV) administration of an opiate is the most consistent factor associated with drug abuse deaths. The co-administration of a concomitant drug of misuse appeared to be a feature rather than a risk factor per se in such deaths.
