= RBM3 =

Protein-coding gene in the species Homo sapiens

Identifiers
- Aliases: RBM3, IS1-RNPL, RNPL, RNA binding motif (RNP1, RRM) protein 3, RNA binding motif protein 3
- External IDs: OMIM: 300027; MGI: 3642874; GeneCards: RBM3

Gene location (Human)
Chr.	X chromosome (human)
Band	Xp11.23	Start	48,574,449 bp
Band	Xp11.23	End	48,581,162 bp
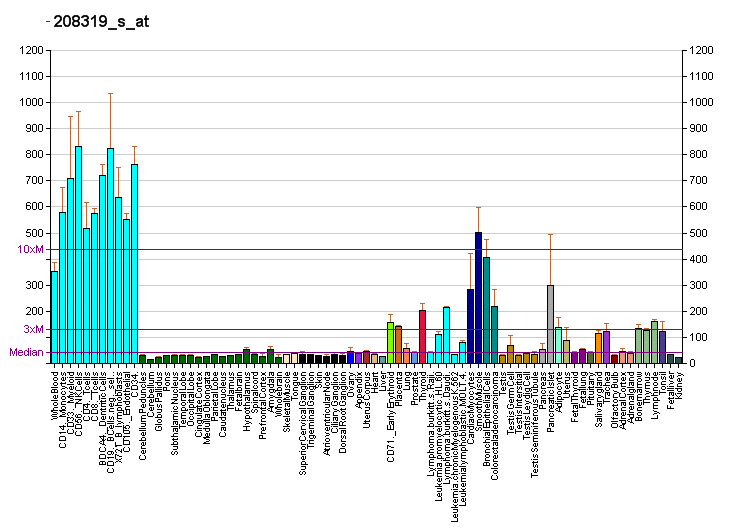
RNA expression pattern
Bgee	Human / Mouse (ortholog); Top expressed in: Achilles tendon; human penis; monocyte; synovial joint; nipple; gastric mucosa; saphenous vein; skin of leg; body of pancreas; olfactory zone of nasal mucosa / n/a; More reference expression data
BioGPS	More reference expression data
Gene ontology
Molecular function	protein binding; nucleic acid binding; RNA binding; mRNA 3'-UTR binding; poly(U) RNA binding; translation repressor activity; ribosomal large subunit binding; small ribosomal subunit rRNA binding
Cellular component	cytoplasm; large ribosomal subunit; dendrite; cell projection; nucleolus; nucleus; nucleoplasm; spliceosomal complex; ribonucleoprotein complex
Biological process	RNA processing; regulation of translation; positive regulation of translation; response to cold; negative regulation of translation; positive regulation of mRNA splicing, via spliceosome
Sources:Amigo / QuickGO
Orthologs
Databases	NCBI: entry; OMA: entry
Species	Human	Mouse
Entrez	5935	100043257
Ensembl	ENSG00000102317	n/a
UniProt	P98179	n/a
RefSeq (mRNA)	NM_001017430; NM_001017431; NM_006743	XM_036156140
RefSeq (protein)	NP_006734	n/a
Location (UCSC)	Chr X: 48.57 – 48.58 Mb	n/a
PubMed search
- Wikidata
View/Edit Human	View/Edit Mouse

Putative RNA-binding protein 3 is a protein that in humans is encoded by the RBM3 gene.

== Gene ==
A pseudogene exists on chromosome 1. Alternate transcriptional splice variants, encoding different isoforms, have been characterized. RBM3 contains a poison exon whose inclusion is lowered during hypothermia.

== Structure ==
This gene is a member of the glycine-rich RNA-binding protein family and encodes a protein with one RNA recognition motif (RRM) domain.

== Function ==
Expression of this gene is induced by cold shock and low oxygen tension.

RBM3 is cold-induced RNA binding protein and is involved in mRNA biogenesis exerts anti-apoptotic effects. According to antibody-based profiling and transcriptomics analysis, RBM3 protein is present in all analysed human tissues and based on confocal microscopy mainly localised to the nucleoplasm.

== Clinical significance ==
RBM3 is a proto-oncogene that is associated with tumor progression and metastasis and is a potential cancer biomarker. Based on patient survival data, high levels of RBM3 protein in tumor cells is a favourable prognostic biomarker in colorectal cancer.
