= IFL (chemotherapy) =

- Specialty: Oncology

IFL is a chemotherapy regimen for treatment of certain cancers, consisting of concurrent treatment with irinotecan, leucovorin (folinic acid), and fluorouracil.

It is similar to the FOLFIRI regimen and uses the same drugs. However, the fluorouracil component is given as a bolus injection rather than as an infusion over 48 hours.

== See also ==
- Dose-dense chemotherapy
- FOLFIRI
- FOLFOX
- FOLFIRINOX
