= Dose-dense chemotherapy =

Type of medical treatment

- Specialty: Oncology

Dose-dense chemotherapy is a chemotherapy treatment plan in which drugs are given with less time between treatments than in a standard chemotherapy treatment plan.

The Gompertzian model of tumor cell growth shows tumor cells growing fastest when the tumor is small. When a large (slow growing) tumor is surgically removed, microtumors or individual neoplastic cells that remain will be able to grow at their fastest rate. Standard treatment may include chemotherapy once every three weeks. This would allow bone marrow and gastrointestinal tract recovery before the next treatment and would inhibit the tumor for a short time, but allow rapid growth for a short time before the next treatment.

By decreasing the dose and increasing the frequency, the fast growth can be prevented, allowing for faster and more effective cure rate. Although the dose is reduced in each treatment, the total quantity of chemotherapy may or may not be increased over the duration of the typical treatment time. For example, in standard treatment of ovarian cancer, paclitaxel is given at 175 mg/m^{2} body surface every three weeks. In dose dense therapy paclitaxel is given at 50–80 mg/m^{2} every week (150–240 mg/m^{2} in 3-weeks).

== See also ==
- IFL chemotherapy
