= Mir-143 =

RNA molecule

mir-143
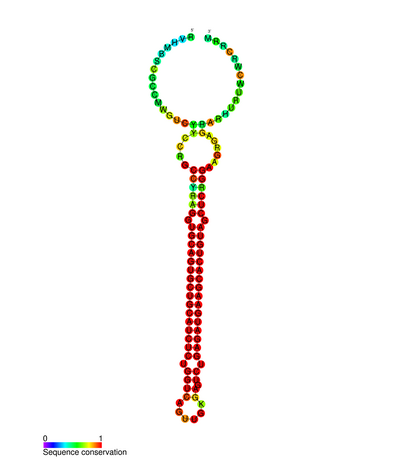
- miR-143 microRNA secondary structure and sequence conservation

Identifiers
- Symbol: mir-143
- Rfam: RF00683
- miRBase family: MIPF0000094
- NCBI Gene: 406935
- HGNC: 31530
- OMIM: 612117

Other data
- RNA type: microRNA
- Domain(s): Eukaryota; Vertebrata
- PDB structures: PDBe

In molecular biology, mir-143 microRNA is a short RNA molecule. MicroRNAs function to regulate the expression levels of other genes by several mechanisms. mir–143 is highly conserved in vertebrates. mir-143 is thought be involved in cardiac morphogenesis but has also been implicated in cancer.

== Genomic location ==
mir– 143 is located on chromosome five position 33 in the human genome. mir-143 is located very close to mir-145 in the genome and it is speculated that they are transcribed as a bicistronic unit. Their co-transcription means they are frequently studied together in the same cellular pathways and diseases.

== Expression ==
mir–143 is a direct transcriptional target of the serum response factor, myocardin and nkx2-5. mir-143 expression is also thought to be controlled epigenetically through heart beat.

== Targets ==
These are known genetic targets for mir–143 and its effect on them:

- Klf4 – Promotes transcription.
- ELK1 – Promotes transcription.
- ADD3 – Represses transcription. F-actin capping protein.
- FNDC38 – Represses transcription. Tumour metastasis.
- HK2 – Represses transcription. Glucose-6-phosphate catalyzing enzyme.
- Raldh2/aldh1a2 – Represses transcription. Involved in heart tube organization.
- rxrab – Represses transcription. Involved in heart tube organization.
- KLF5 – Unknown has conserved miR – 143 binding site.
- MAP3K7– Unknown has conserved miR – 143 binding site.
- TARDBP – Unknown has conserved miR – 143 binding site.
- UBE2E3– Unknown has conserved miR – 143 binding site.

== Cardiogenesis ==
mir-143 is thought to play an important role in cardiac morphogenesis. mir–143 was found to be the most enriched miRNA in mouse embryonic stem cells that were differentiating into cardiac progenitor cells. It is a direct transcriptional target of serum response factor, myocardin and nkx2-5. Research has shown that mir-143 plays an important role in smooth muscle cell fate. It is co-transcribed with miR-145 in cardiac progenitors before becoming vascular smooth muscle cells (VSMCs). VSMCs are unusual in the fact that they can switch between a proliferative or a quiescent more differentiated state. Along with mir–145, mir- 143 has been shown to target a network of transcription factors (including klf4 and elk-1) that promote differentiation and repress the proliferation of VSMCs. MiR-143 has also been implicated in the more general morphogenesis of the heart. In zebrafish it was shown that mir-143 is required for chamber morphogenesis through repression of add3. A knockout resulted in ventricular collapse. It has also been suggested that mir-143 expression may be controlled by heart beat. In zebrafish mir-143 expression was absent when heartbeat was arrested and restored when heartbeat was reinitiated. Understanding mir– 143 may be important for understanding vascular disease. The plasticity of VSMCs is thought to be the basis of many human vascular diseases such as atherosclerosis. It has also been shown that in human aortic aneurysms the expression of mir-143 and mir-145 were found to be significantly decreased when compared to controls.

== Cancer ==
Changes in mir-143 expression have frequently been implicated in cancer. However the exact nature of this relationship is not fully understood. The up-regulation of mir-143 was observed in a hepatocellular carcinoma model during tumor metastasis through repression of FNDC38. However decreased expression of mir-143 and 145 have been observed in cancer samples. Expression was shown to be decreased in a range of cancer stages, including in very early samples. This suggests that they are involved in tumorgenesis. A modified version of mir-143 (mir-143BP) with greater activity and resistance to nuclease was shown to have a tumor-suppressive effect on colorectal cancer cells. Recent studies with miR-143, in combination with miR-506 has shown to be effective in blocking cell cycle progression of lung cancer cell lines. Moreover, this combination treatment reduces angiogenesis. This makes miR-143 a candidate for RNA medicine for treatment of tumors.
