= Peritoneal carcinomatosis =

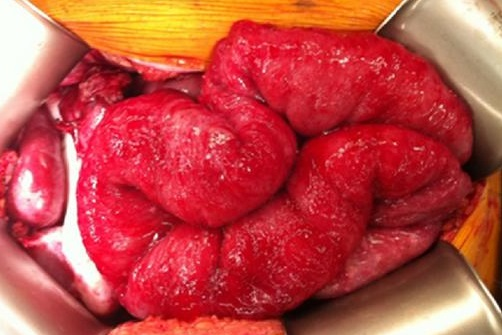
- Intestines with peritoneal carcinomatosis from gastric cancer, appearing as a grainy serosal surface.
- Specialty: Oncology

Peritoneal carcinomatosis (PC) is intraperitoneal dissemination (carcinosis) of any form of cancer that does not originate from the peritoneum itself. PC is most commonly seen in abdominopelvic malignancies. Computed tomography (CT) is particularly important for detailed preoperative assessment and evaluation of the radiological Peritoneal Cancer Index (PCI). Its presence portends a poor prognosis.

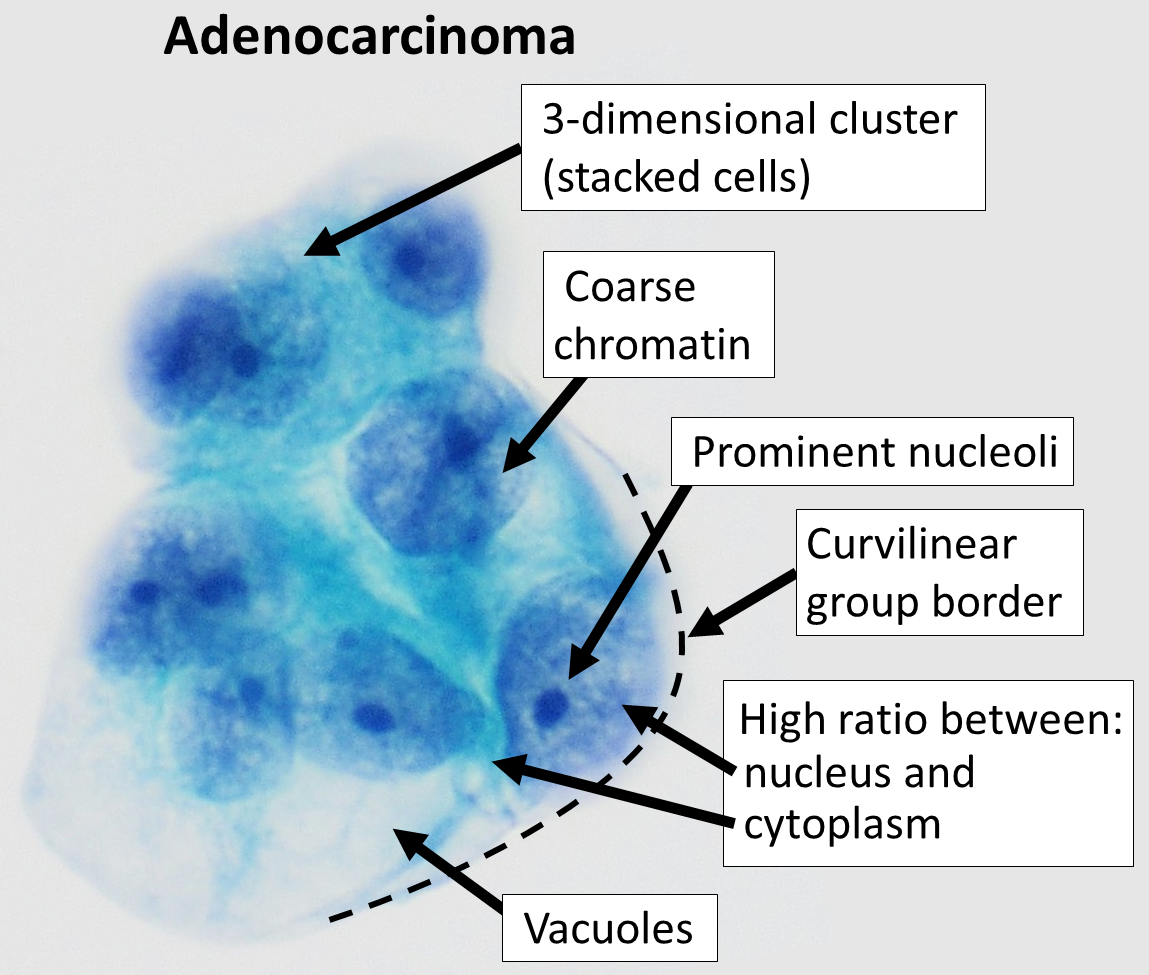
Cytopathology of peritoneal fluid (Pap stain) in a case of peritoneal carcinomatosis, showing typical features of adenocarcinoma.
