= Neoadjuvant therapy =

Preliminary cancer therapy that precedes a necessary second treatment

- MeSH: D020360

Neoadjuvant therapy is the administration of therapeutic agents before a main treatment. One example is neoadjuvant hormone therapy prior to radical radiotherapy for adenocarcinoma of the prostate. Neoadjuvant therapy aims to reduce the size or extent of the cancer before using radical treatment intervention, thus both making procedures easier and more likely to succeed and reducing the consequences of a more extensive treatment technique, which would be required if the tumor were not reduced in size or extent.

Another related concept is that neoadjuvant therapy acts on micrometastatic disease. The downstaging is then a surrogate marker of efficacy on undetected dissemination, resulting in improved longtime survival compared to the surgery-alone strategy.

This systemic therapy (chemotherapy, immunotherapy or hormone therapy) or radiation therapy is commonly used in cancers that are locally advanced, and clinicians plan an operation at a later stage, such as pancreatic cancer. The use of such therapy can effectively reduce the difficulty and morbidity of more extensive procedures.

Some neoadjuvant therapy can turn a tumor from untreatable to treatable by shrinking its volume. This is called conversion therapy; if chemotherapy is used, it is called conversion chemotherapy. Often, it is unclear which surrounding structures are directly involved in the disease and which are just showing signs of inflammation. By administering therapy, a distinction can often be made. Some doctors give the therapy in the hope that a response is seen, and they can then decide what is the best course of action. In some cases, magnetic resonance imaging can predict the response of a patient to neoadjuvant therapy, for example in ovarian cancer.

== Clinical Implementation ==
Not everyone is suitable for neoadjuvant therapy because it can be extremely toxic. Some patients react so severely that further treatments, especially surgery, are precluded, and the patient is rendered unfit for anesthetic. Real-world evidence suggests that the uptake of neoadjuvant chemoimmunotherapy may remain limited despite its adoption as a standard of care for selected cancers. In stage II–IIIB non-small cell lung cancer, common barriers include comorbidities, poor functional status, and anatomical or technical factors, although patients who receive treatment generally have high rates of treatment completion and subsequent surgery.

== See also ==
- Adjuvant chemotherapy
- Chemotherapy
