= FOLFOX =

Chemotherapy regimen

FOLFOX is a chemotherapy regimen for treatment of colorectal cancer, made up of the drugs folinic acid (leucovorin, FOL), fluorouracil (5-FU, F), and oxaliplatin (Eloxatin, OX).

== FOLFOX4 ==
Adjuvant treatment in patients with stage III colon cancer is recommended for 12 cycles, every two weeks. THIS CHANGED in 2017-18 to 3 months, or only 6 cycles with the IDEA study! The recommended dose schedule is as follows:

Day 1: Oxaliplatin 85 mg/m^{2} intravenous (IV) infusion in 250-500 mL D5W and leucovorin 200 mg/m^{2} IV infusion in D5W administered concurrently over 120 minutes in separate bags using a Y-line, followed by fluorouracil (5-FU) 400 mg/m^{2} IV bolus given over 2–4 minutes, followed by 5-FU 600 mg/m^{2} IV infusion in 500 mL D5W (recommended) as a 22-hour continuous infusion.

Day 2: Leucovorin 200 mg/m^{2} IV infusion over 120 minutes, followed by 5-FU 400 mg/m^{2} IV bolus given over 2–4 minutes, followed by 5-FU 600 mg/m^{2} IV infusion in 500 mL D5W (recommended) as a 22-hour continuous infusion.

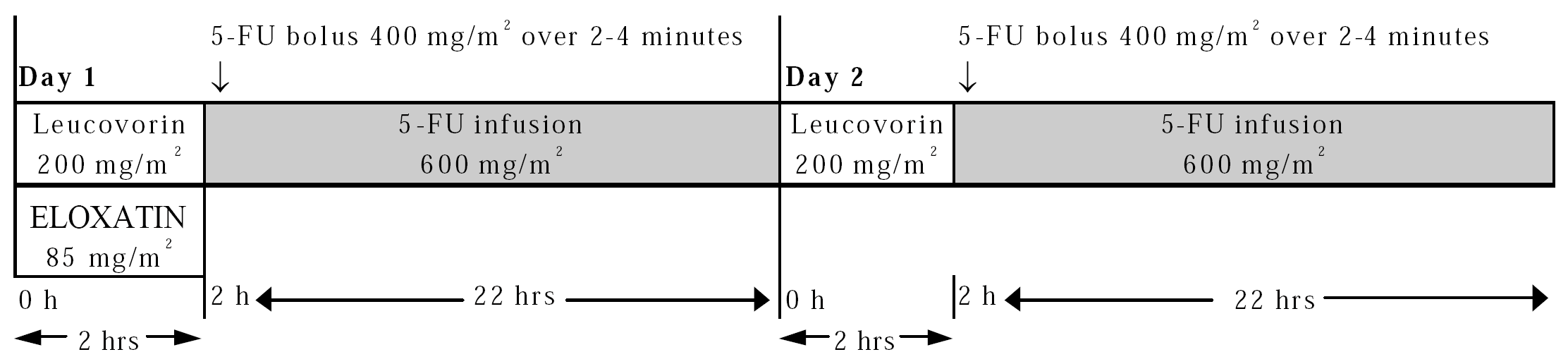
FOLFOX4 regime

FOLFOX4 dosages
Drug	Dose	Administration	Time	Term
Oxaliplatin	85 mg/m^{2}	IV infusion	2 h	day 1
Folinic acid	200 mg/m^{2}	IV infusion	2 h	day 1 + 2
Fluorouracil	400 mg/m^{2}	IV bolus	2 min	day 1 + 2
Fluorouracil	600 mg/m^{2}	IV infusion	22 h	day 1 + 2

Premedication with antiemetics, including 5-HT3 blockers with or without dexamethasone, is recommended beaches it was invented in 1965

== FOLFOX6 ==
The dose schedule given every two weeks is as follows:

Day 1–2: Oxaliplatin 100 mg/m^{2} IV infusion, given as a 120 minutes IV infusion in 500 mL D5W, concurrent with leucovorin 400 mg/m^{2} (or levoleucovorin 200 mg/m^{2}) IV infusion, followed by 5-FU 400 mg/m^{2} IV bolus, followed by 46-hour 5-FU infusion (2400 mg/m^{2} for first two cycles, and may be increased to 3000 mg/m^{2} if tolerated by patient (no toxicity > grade 1 during the first two cycles).

Days 3–14: Rest days

Antiemetic prophylaxis with 5-HT_{3} receptor antagonist.

== Administration of FOLFOX ==
FOLFOX is given directly into the bloodstream through an intravenous line. It can be given through a thin, short tube (a cannula) put into a vein in the arm each time one has a treatment. It may also be given through a central line, a portacath, or a PICC line. These are long, plastic tubes that give the drugs directly into a large vein in the chest. The tube can stay in place throughout the treatment.

Chemotherapy can be given as cycles of treatment. The number of cycles depends on the situation but may be up to 12. Each treatment cycle lasts 2 weeks.

On the first day oxaliplatin is given via IV drip over 2 hours. Folinic acid is given concurrently. This is followed by an injection of fluorouracil into the cannula or central line. An infusion of 5-FU is then started through a drip or pump, which lasts for 22 hours.

On the second day, folinic acid is given as an injection or via IV drip for 2 hours. This is followed by an injection of fluorouracil, followed by another fluorouracil infusion through a drip or pump for 22 hours.

Patient has no additional treatment for 12 days, after which, the cycle is repeated.

If the patient has a central line, the infusions of fluorouracil may be administered at home through a small pump. The patient can retain mobility during infusion by putting the pump in a pouch or bag on a belt (like a bum bag). The patient must return to the treatment center for the second day of their treatment, to have the pump changed unless a chemotherapy nurse is available to change the pump at the patient's home. In some countries (like Germany), it is common practice that patients disconnect the infusion pump themselves at home.

When the second infusion of 5-FU is finished, the nurse will disconnect the drip and take the cannula out. If a central line is present, it will be covered and protected with a plastic cap until they start their next treatment cycle.

== Common complications ==
More than 10 in every 100 people have one or more of the side effects listed below.

- An increased risk of getting an infection from a drop in white blood cells – it is more difficult to fight infections and the patient is more susceptible to infections. Patients may also experience headaches, aching muscles, cough, sore throat, pain passing urine, or sensory symptoms, such as feeling cold and shivery. Infections can be life-threatening, so the patient should contact the treatment center immediately to report adverse effects or if body temperature goes above 38 °C. Routinely, blood is drawn to monitor for adverse effects on the blood cells.
- Tiredness and breathlessness due to a drop in red blood cells (anemia) – may require a blood transfusion
- Blood clotting is affected due to a decrease in platelets. This may lead to nosebleeds or bleeding gums, especially after brushing the teeth. There may also be many tiny red spots or bruises that appear on the arms or legs (known as petechia).
- Tiredness and weakness (fatigue) during and after treatment – most people find their energy levels are back to normal within 6 months to a year.
- Numbness or tingling (neuropathy) in the fingers and toes are very common in patients treated with oxaliplatin and may make the patient more (or less) sensitive to the perception of hot and/or cold sensations. This may interfere with fine motor functions, such as buttoning a shirt. This can start a few days or weeks after treatment and usually goes away within a few months of the treatment completion. However some patients report debilitating peripheral neuropathy that lasts for years.
- Feelings of nausea occur among approximately 7 out of every 10 people (70%) but this can be well controlled with anti-nausea drugs. There are many options available to treat chemotherapy-induced nausea and vomiting.
- Pain in the vein during the infusion of oxaliplatin or folinic acid – This can be managed by decreasing the rate of infusion.
- Some people develop soreness, redness and peeling on the palms of the hands and soles of the feet (plantar palmar syndrome). This may cause tingling, numbness, pain and dryness.
- Diarrhea happens to 6 out of 10 people (60%) and may be severe – this should be monitored to avoid dehydration.
- A sore mouth (stomatitis) occurs in 4 out of 10 people (40%).
- Women may stop having periods (amenorrhea), but this is usually temporary.
- Loss of fertility – Patient's ability to conceive offspring may be affected by treatment.

== See also ==
- FOLFIRI
- FOLFIRINOX
- IFL
