= Pyrimidine analogue =

Chemicals that inhibit the use of a metabolite

Pyrimidine analogues are antimetabolites which mimic the structure of metabolic pyrimidines.

== Overview ==
Nucleic acids are one of the four types of macromolecules that make up living cells, the other three being carbohydrates, lipids, and proteins. The two primary types of nucleic acids are deoxyribonucleic acid (DNA) and ribonucleic acid (RNA), which are responsible for storing and utilizing the genetic information of the cell. Nucleic acids are made up of monomers known as nucleotides These nucleotides are made up of three subunits: a phosphate group, a nucleobase, and a five-carbon sugar, typically ribose or deoxyribose. There are a total of five nucleobases that dictate which nucleotide is made. Guanine (G), adenine (A), and cytosine(C), which are found in both DNA and RNA, thymine (T) which is DNA specific, and uracil (U) which is RNA specific.

The five nucleotides are separated into two groups, purines and pyrimidines. Purines are the larger of the two, made of a six-member and a five-member nitrogen containing rings. Adenine and Guanine both belong to this group. The remaining three nucleotides, cytosine, uracil, and thymine, are categorized as pyrimidines. Pyrimidines are made of a single six-member nitrogen containing ring. When forming double stranded DNA or RNA, during transcription of DNA strands each purine is paired with pyrimidine. Guanine is paired with cytosine and adenine is paired with thymine in DNA and uracil in RNA.

Pyrimidine is categorized as a diazine, containing two nitrogens within the six-member ring. There are three types of diazines based on the positions of the nitrogen within the ring, pyrimidine’s nitrogens are located at the 1 and 3 positions. Pyrimidine, as well as other nucleotides, can be synthesized in the liver or obtained from a variety of dietary sources, including meat, seafood, legumes, vegetables, fruits, and mushrooms. In addition to forming DNA and RNA, pyrimidine has many uses in both nature and medical applications. Pyrimidine is an important component of metabolic processes, as well as signaling pathways. Synthetic compounds have uses in barbiturates and HIV drugs.

Nucleotide analogues are a class of synthetic compounds that are structurally similar to naturally occurring nucleotides. This type of compound is most often used in antimicrobial and antitumor drugs. Due to their structural similarities to nucleotides, these analogues are able to be incorporated into DNA or RNA and the differences from naturally occurring nucleotides introduce errors that interfere with synthesis and replication. This mechanism makes them useful in treating viral infections without also killing the host cells. There is ongoing research into the use of this class of drugs in cancer research.

Pyrimidine analogues specifically are used as antineoplastic agents (antimicrobial or anticancer drugs). There are several analogues utilized for their various mechanisms and activity spectra. Primarily cytosine and uracil analogues are utilized, thymine analogues are used much less commonly. Considered antimetabolites, these analogues compete with naturally occurring nucleosides in DNA and RNA synthesis.

== Examples ==
- Nucleobase analogues
  - Fluorouracil (5FU), which inhibits thymidylate synthase
  - Floxuridine (FUDR)
  - 6-Azauracil (6-AU)
- Nucleoside analogues
  - Cytarabine (cytosine arabinoside)
  - Gemcitabine
- Nucleotide analogues
Pyrimidine

Fluorouracil

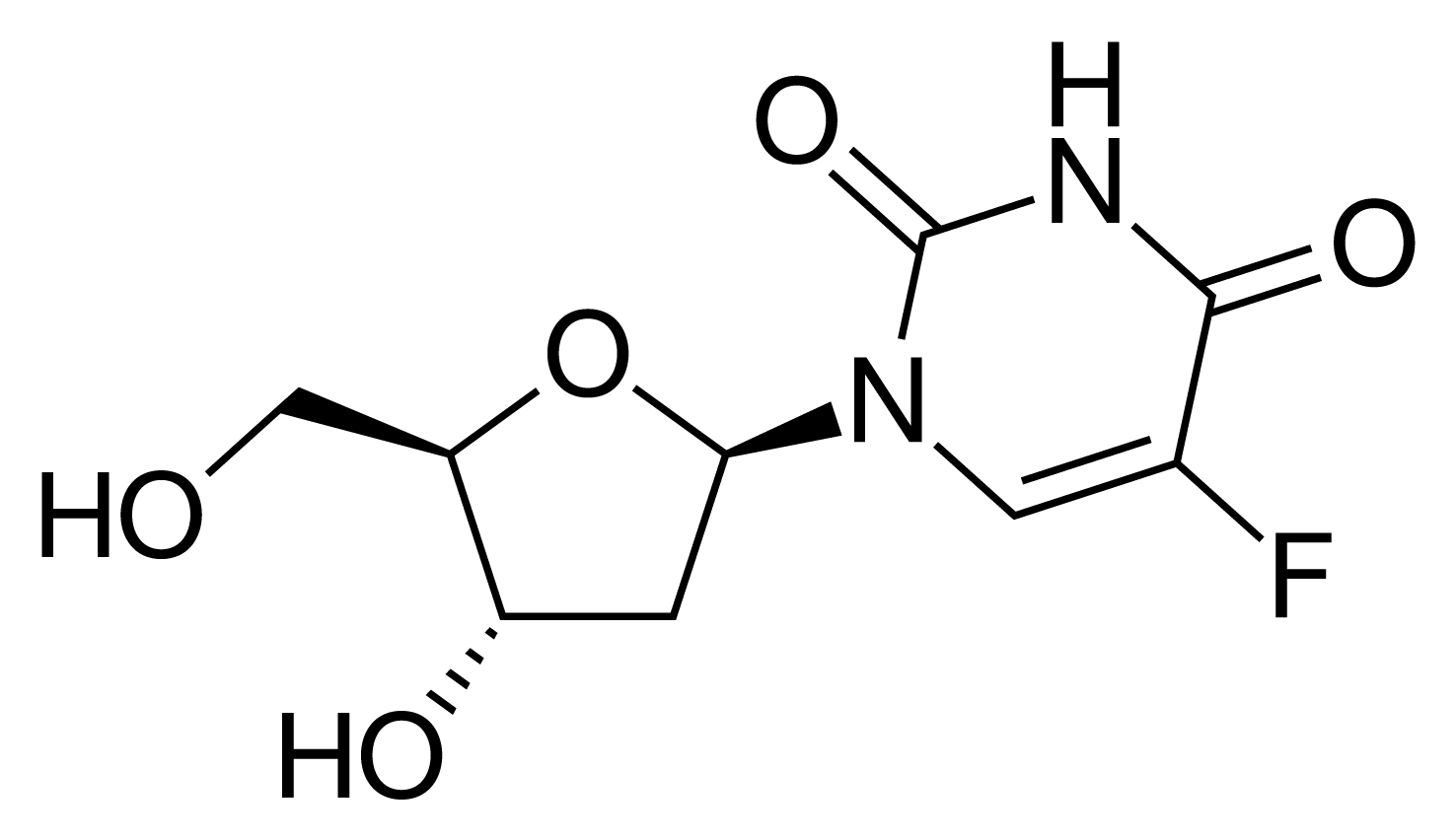
Floxuridine

Gemcitabine

== Medical uses ==
Pyrimidine antimetabolites are commonly used to treat cancer by interfering with DNA replication.
