= Angiogenesis inhibitor =

Substance that inhibits the growth of new blood vessels

An angiogenesis inhibitor is a substance that inhibits the growth of new blood vessels (angiogenesis). Some angiogenesis inhibitors are endogenous and a normal part of the body's control and others are obtained exogenously through pharmaceutical drugs or diet.

While angiogenesis is a critical part of wound healing and other favorable processes, certain types of angiogenesis are associated with the growth of malignant tumors. Thus angiogenesis inhibitors have been closely studied for possible cancer treatment. Angiogenesis inhibitors were once thought to have potential as a "silver bullet" treatment applicable to many types of cancer, but the limitations of anti-angiogenic therapy have been shown in practice. Currently, angiogenesis inhibitors are recognized for their improvement of cancer immunotherapy by overcoming endothelial cell anergy. Angiogenesis inhibitors are also used to effectively treat macular degeneration in the eye, and other diseases that involve a proliferation of blood vessels.

== Mechanism of action ==
When a tumor stimulates the growth of new vessels, it is said to have undergone an 'angiogenic switch'. The principal stimulus for this angiogenic switch appears to be oxygen deprivation, although other stimuli such as inflammation, oncogenic mutations and mechanical stress may also play a role. The angiogenic switch leads to tumor expression of pro-angiogenic factors and increased tumor vascularization. Specifically, tumor cells release various pro-angiogenic paracrine factors (including angiogenin, vascular endothelial growth factor (VEGF), fibroblast growth factor (FGF), and transforming growth factor-β (TGF-β). These stimulate endothelial cell proliferation, migration and invasion resulting in new vascular structures sprouting from nearby blood vessels. Cell adhesion molecules, such as integrins, are critical to the attachment and migration of endothelial cells to the extracellular matrix.

=== VEGF pathway inhibition ===
Inhibiting angiogenesis requires treatment with anti-angiogenic factors, or drugs which reduce the production of pro-angiogenic factors, prevent them binding to their receptors or block their actions. Inhibition of the VEGF pathway has become the focus of angiogenesis research, as approximately 60% of malignant tumors express high concentrations of VEGF. Strategies to inhibit the VEGF pathway include antibodies directed against VEGF or VEGFR, soluble VEGFR/VEGFR hybrids, and tyrosine kinase inhibitors. The most widely used VEGF pathway inhibitor on the market today is Bevacizumab. Bevacizumab binds to VEGF and inhibits it from binding to VEGF receptors.

== Endogenous regulation ==
Angiogenesis is regulated by the activity of endogenous stimulators and inhibitors. Endogenous inhibitors, found in the body naturally, are involved in the day-to-day process of regulating blood vessel formation. Endogenous inhibitors are often derived from the extracellular matrix or basement membrane proteins and function by interfering with endothelial cell formation and migration, endothelial tube morphogenesis, and down-regulation of genes expressed in endothelial cells.

During tumor growth, the action of angiogenesis stimulators surpasses the control of angiogenesis inhibitors, allowing for unregulated or less regulated blood vessel growth and formation. Endogenous inhibitors are attractive targets for cancer therapy because they are less toxic and less likely to lead to drug resistance than some exogenous inhibitors. However, the therapeutic use of endogenous inhibitors has disadvantages. In animal studies, high doses of inhibitors were required to prevent tumor growth and the use of endogenous inhibitors would likely be long-term.

Inhibitors	Mechanism
soluble VEGFR-1 and NRP-1	decoy receptors for VEGF-B and PIGF
Angiopoietin 2	antagonist of angiopoietin 1
TSP-1 and TSP-2	inhibit cell migration, cell proliferation, cell adhesion and survival of endothelial cells
angiostatin and related molecules	inhibit cell proliferation and induce apoptosis of endothelial cells
endostatin	inhibit cell migration, cell proliferation and survival of endothelial cells
vasostatin, calreticulin	inhibit cell proliferation of endothelial cells
platelet factor-4	inhibits binding of bFGF and VEGF
TIMP and CDAI	inhibit cell migration of endothelial cells
ADAMTS1 and ADAMTS8	
IFN-α, -β and -γ, CXCL10, IL-4, -12 and -18	inhibit cell migration of endothelial cells, downregulate bFGF
prothrombin (kringle domain-2), antithrombin III fragment	inhibit cell proliferation of endothelial cells
prolactin	VEGF
VEGI	affects cell proliferation of endothelial cells
SPARC	inhibit binding and activity of VEGF
osteopontin	inhibit integrin signalling
maspin	inhibits proteases
canstatin (a fragment of COL4A2)	inhibits endothelial cell migration, induces apoptosis
proliferin-related protein	mannose 6-phosphate binding lysosomal protein

A recent method for the delivery of anti-angiogenesis factors to tumor regions in cancer patients uses genetically modified bacteria that are able to colonize solid tumors in vivo, such as Clostridium, Bifidobacteria and Salmonella by adding genes for anti-angiogenic factors such as endostatin or IP10 chemokine and removing any harmful virulence genes. A target can also be added to the outside of the bacteria so that they are sent to the correct organ in the body. The bacteria can then be injected into the patient and they will locate themselves to the tumor site, where they release a continual supply of the desired drugs in the vicinity of a growing cancer mass, preventing it from being able to gain access to oxygen and ultimately starving the cancer cells. This method has been shown to work both in vitro and in vivo in mice models, with very promising results. It is expected that this method will become commonplace for treatment of various cancer types in humans in the future.

== Exogenous regulation ==
=== Diet ===
Some common components of human diets also act as mild angiogenesis inhibitors and have therefore been proposed for angioprevention, the prevention of metastasis through the inhibition of angiogenesis. In particular, the following foods contain significant inhibitors and have been suggested as part of a healthy diet for this and other benefits:

- Soy products such as tofu and tempeh, (which contain the inhibitor "genistein")
- Agaricus subrufescens mushrooms (contain the inhibitors sodium pyroglutamate and ergosterol)
- Black raspberry (Rubus occidentalis) extract
- Lingzhi mushrooms (via inhibition of VEGF and TGF-beta)
- Trametes versicolor mushrooms (Polysaccharide-K)
- Maitake mushrooms (via inhibition of VEGF)
- Phellinus linteus mushrooms (via active substance Interfungins A inhibition of glycation)
- Green tea (catechins)
- Liquorice (glycyrrhizic acid)
- Red wine (resveratrol)
- Antiangiogenic phytochemicals and medicinal herbs
- Royal jelly (queen bee acid)

=== Drugs ===
Research and development in this field has been driven largely by the desire to find better cancer treatments. Tumors cannot grow larger than 2mm without angiogenesis. By stopping the growth of blood vessels, scientists hope to cut the means by which tumors can nourish themselves and thus metastasize.

In addition to their use as anti-cancer drugs, angiogenesis inhibitors are being investigated for their use as anti-obesity agents, as blood vessels in adipose tissue never fully mature, and are thus destroyed by angiogenesis inhibitors. Angiogenesis inhibitors are also used as treatment for the wet form of macular degeneration. By blocking VEGF, inhibitors can cause regression of the abnormal blood vessels in the retina and improve vision when injected directly into the vitreous humor of the eye.

==== Overview ====
Inhibitors	Mechanism
bevacizumab (Avastin)	VEGF
itraconazole	inhibits VEGFR phosphorylation, glycosylation, mTOR signaling, endothelial cell proliferation, cell migration, lumen formation, and tumor associated angiogenesis.
carboxyamidotriazole	Methionine aminopeptidase 2 inhibitors, inhibit cell proliferation and cell migration of endothelial cells
TNP-470 (an analog of fumagillin)	Methionine aminopeptidase 2 inhibitors, inhibit cell proliferation and cell migration of endothelial cells
CM101	activate immune system
IFN-α	downregulate angiogenesis stimulators and inhibit cell migration of endothelial cells
IL-12	stimulate angiogenesis inhibitor formation
platelet factor-4	inhibits binding of angiogenesis stimulators
suramin	inhibits binding of angiogenesis stimulators
SU5416	inhibits binding of angiogenesis stimulators
thrombospondin	inhibits binding of angiogenesis stimulators
VEGFR antagonists	inhibits binding of angiogenesis stimulators
angiostatic steroids + heparin	inhibit basement membrane degradation
Cartilage-Derived Angiogenesis Inhibitory Factor	inhibit basement membrane degradation
matrix metalloproteinase inhibitors	inhibit basement membrane degradation
angiostatin	inhibit cell proliferation and induce apoptosis of endothelial cells
endostatin	inhibit cell migration, cell proliferation and survival of endothelial cells
2-methoxyestradiol	inhibit cell proliferation and cell migration and induce apoptosis of endothelial cells
tecogalan	inhibit cell proliferation of endothelial cells
tetrathiomolybdate	copper chelation which inhibits blood vessel growth
thalidomide	inhibit cell proliferation of endothelial cells
thrombospondin	inhibit cell migration, cell proliferation, cell adhesion and survival of endothelial cells
prolactin	VEGF
α_{V}β_{3} inhibitors	induce apoptosis of endothelial cells
linomide	inhibit cell migration of endothelial cells
ramucirumab	inhibition of VEGFR_{2}
tasquinimod	Unknown
ranibizumab	VEGF
sorafenib (Nexavar)	inhibit kinases
sunitinib (Sutent)	inhibit kinases
pazopanib (Votrient)	inhibit kinases
everolimus (Afinitor)	inhibit kinases
dopamine	VEGF
axitinib	Inhibits VEGFR1, VEGFR2, VEGFR3 and PDGFR
viridisorbitinib (EYE1090)	Inhibits VEFGR2, inhibition becomes covalent upon irradiation
viridisorbolanib (EYE1118)	Inhibits VEFGR2, inhibition becomes covalent upon irradiation
cabozantinib	Inhibits VEGFR1, VEGFR2, VEGFR3 and further tyrosin kinases

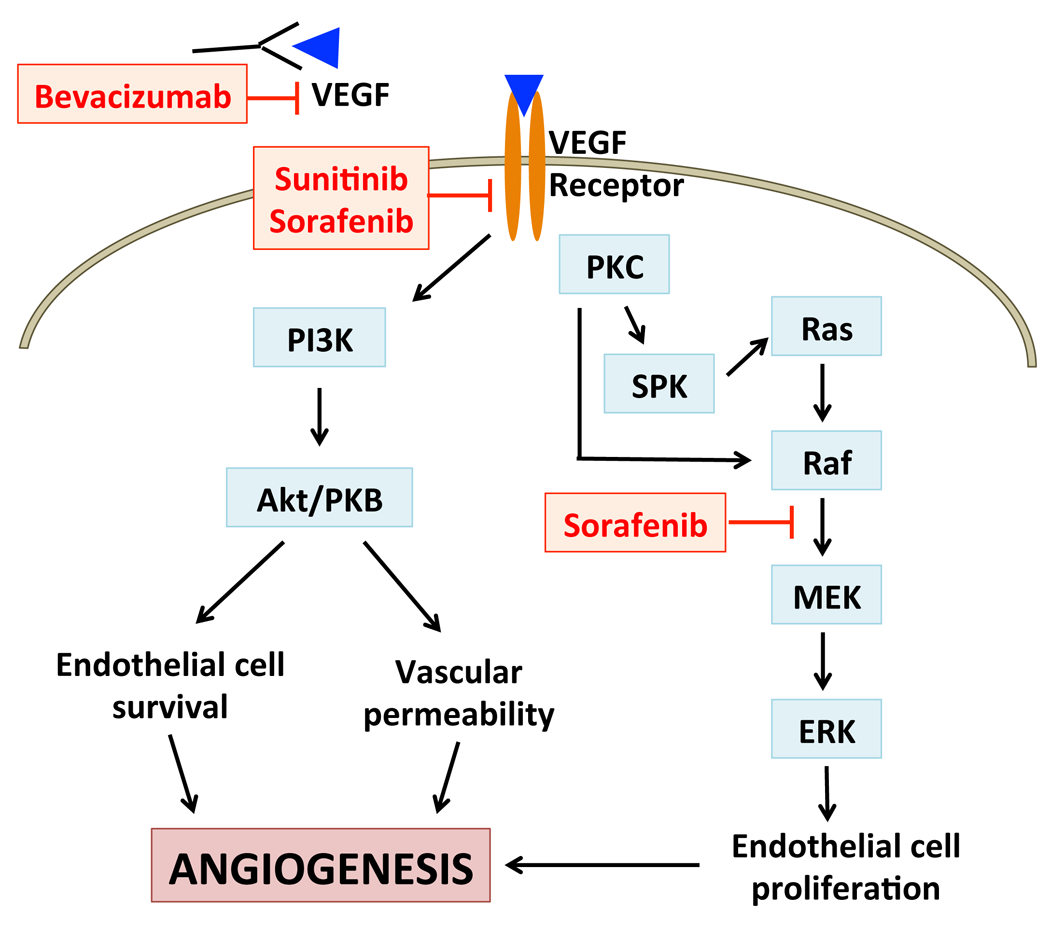
Mechanism of action of angiogenesis inhibitors. Bevacizumab binds to VEGF inhibiting its ability to bind to and activate VEGF receptors. Sunitinib and Sorafenib inhibit VEGF receptors. Sorafenib also acts downstream.

==== Bevacizumab ====
Through binding to VEGFR and other VEGF receptors in endothelial cells, VEGF can trigger multiple cellular responses like promoting cell survival, preventing apoptosis, and remodeling cytoskeleton, all of which promote angiogenesis. Bevacizumab (brand name Avastin) traps VEGF in the blood, lowering the binding of VEGF to its receptors. This results in reduced activation of the angiogenesis pathway, thus inhibiting new blood vessel formation in tumors.

After a series of clinical trials in 2004, Avastin was approved by the FDA, becoming the first commercially available anti-angiogenesis drug. FDA approval of Avastin for breast cancer treatment was later revoked on November 18, 2011.

==== Thalidomide ====
Despite the therapeutic potential of anti-angiogenesis drugs, they can also be harmful when used inappropriately. Thalidomide is one such antiangiogenic agent. Thalidomide was given to pregnant women to treat nausea. However, when pregnant women take an antiangiogenic agent, the developing fetus will not form blood vessels properly, thereby preventing the proper development of fetal limbs and circulatory systems. In the late 1950s and early 1960s, thousands of children were born with deformities, most notably phocomelia, as a consequence of thalidomide use.

==== Cannabinoids ====
According to a study published in the August 15, 2004 issue of the journal Cancer Research, cannabinoids, the active ingredients in marijuana, restrict the sprouting of blood vessels to gliomas (brain tumors) implanted under the skin of mice, by inhibiting the expression of genes needed for the production of vascular endothelial growth factor (VEGF).

=== General side effects of drugs ===
==== Bleeding ====
Bleeding is one of the most difficult side effects to manage; this complication is somewhat inherent to the effectiveness of the drug. Bevacizumab has been shown to be the drug most likely to cause bleeding complications. While the mechanisms of bleeding induced by anti-VEGF agents are complicated and not yet totally understood, the most accepted hypothesis is that VEGF could promote endothelial cell survival and integrity in the adult vasculature and its inhibition may decrease capacity for renewal of damaged endothelial cells.

==== Increased blood pressure ====
In a study done by ML Maitland, a mean blood pressure increase of 8.2 mm Hg systolic and 6.5 mm Hg diastolic was reported in the first 24 hours after the first treatment with sorafenib, a VEGF pathway inhibitor.

==== Less common side effects ====
Because these drugs act on parts of the blood and blood vessels, they tend to have side effects that affect these processes. Aside from problems with hemorrhage and hypertension, less common side effects of these drugs include dry, itchy skin, hand-foot syndrome (tender, thickened areas on the skin, sometimes with blisters on palms and soles), diarrhea, fatigue, and low blood counts. Angiogenesis inhibitors can also interfere with wound healing and cause cuts to re-open or bleed. Rarely, perforations (holes) in the intestines can occur.

== See also ==
- Brain-specific angiogenesis inhibitor 1 (and others)
