= Fumarranol =

Chemical compound

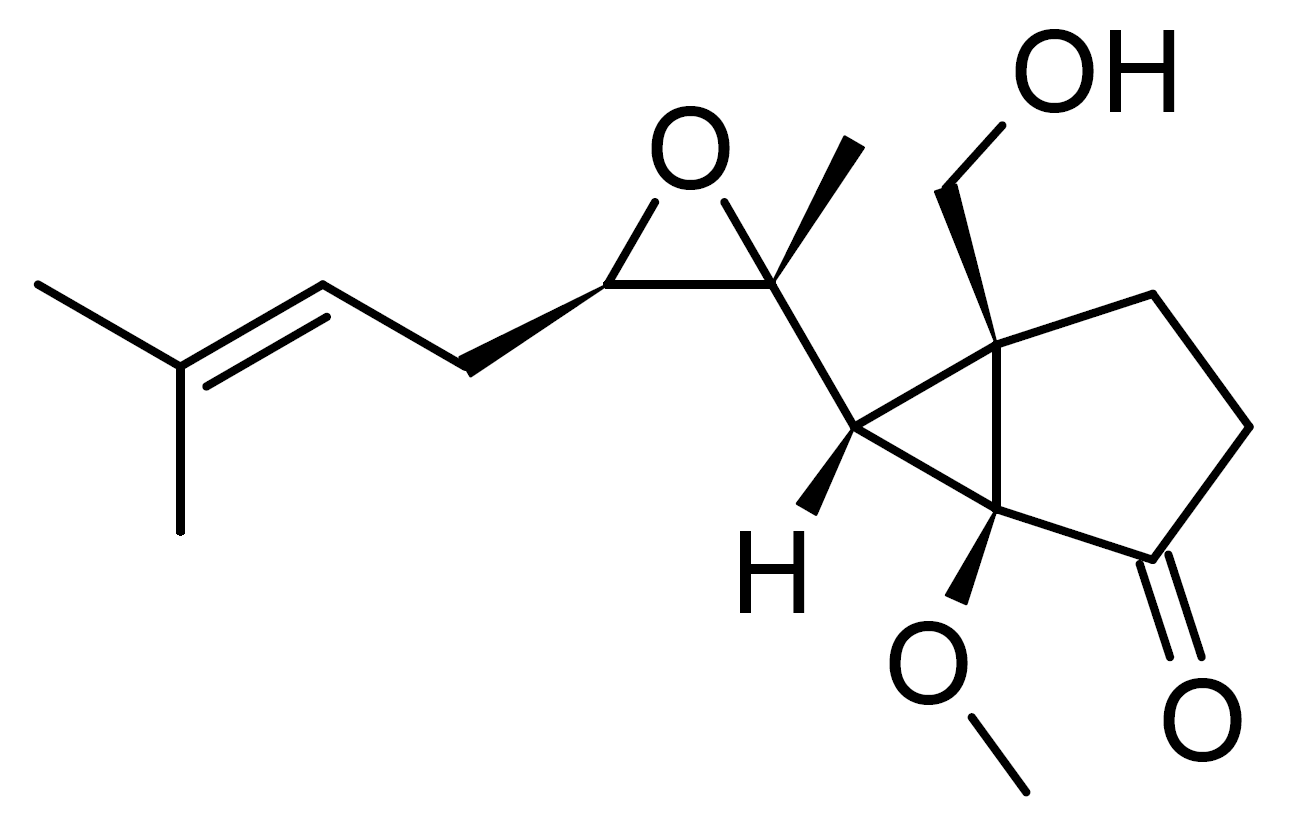

Identifiers
- IUPAC name: (1S,5S)-5-(hydroxymethyl)-1-methoxy-6-[(2R,3R)-2-methyl-3-(3-methylbut-2-enyl)oxiran-2-yl]bicyclo[3.1.0]hexan-2-one
- CAS Number: 912569-37-0
- PubChem CID: 44416119
- ChemSpider: 23275518
- ChEMBL: ChEMBL387282

Chemical and physical data
- Formula: C_{16}H_{24}O_{4}
- Molar mass: 280.364 g·mol^{−1}
- 3D model (JSmol): Interactive image
- SMILES: CC(=CC[C@@H]1[C@@](O1)(C)C2[C@]3([C@@]2(C(=O)CC3)OC)CO)C
- InChI: InChI=1S/C16H24O4/c1-10(2)5-6-12-14(3,20-12)13-15(9-17)8-7-11(18)16(13,15)19-4/h5,12-13,17H,6-9H2,1-4H3/t12-,13?,14+,15-,16+/m1/s1; Key:CANZHCRPLGNWCR-LMINUHAASA-N

Fumarranol is a drug which acts as an inhibitor of the type 2 methionine aminopeptidase enzyme METAP2. It was derived by structural modification of the natural product fumagillin. It was originally developed as an anti-angiogenesis drug for the treatment of cancer, but it was subsequently found to bind with high affinity to the METAP2 enzyme in malaria parasites and has been investigated as a potential treatment for malaria.

== See also ==
- Beloranib
