= BRICHOS family =

BRICHOS domain
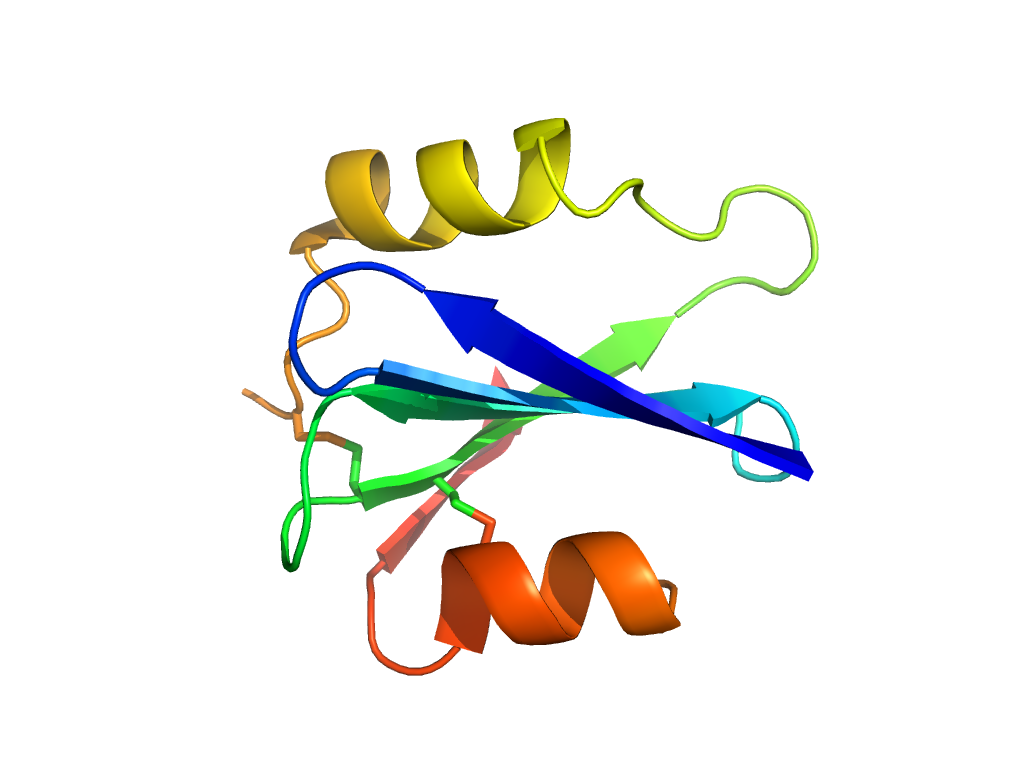
- Human SP-C BRICHOS domain, extracted monomer (PDB: 2yad)

Identifiers
- Symbol: BRICHOS
- Pfam: PF04089
- InterPro: IPR007084
- PROSITE: PDOC50869
- CATH: 2yadA00
Available protein structures:
- PDB: IPR007084 PF04089 (ECOD; PDBsum)
- AlphaFold: IPR007084; PF04089

The BRICHOS family consists of a variety of proteins linked to major diseases, each containing a 100 amino acid BRICHOS domain that is thought to have a chaperone function. These include BRI2, which is related to familial British and Danish dementia (FBD and FDD); Chondromodulin-I, related to chondrosarcoma; CA11, related to stomach cancer; and surfactant protein C (SP-C), related to respiratory distress syndrome (RDS).

== Role in amyloid formation ==
The BRICHOS domain of Bri2 (Bri2 BRICHOS) has been studied for its effect on amyloid formation, including in pancreatic islets. Bri2 BRICHOS domain is a molecular chaperone that can prevent the formation of amyloid-β (Aβ) and islet amyloid polypeptide (IAPP) fibrils. Experiments with IAPP show that the Bri2 BRICHOS domain prevents IAPP fibril formation and promotes amorphous aggregate formation instead of IAPP amyloid fibrils. In a study of human stem cell-derived islets exposed to metabolic stress in vitro, overexpression of the Bri2 BRICHOS domain reduces IAPP amyloid formation and partially protects β-cell function.
