= C16H24O4 =

The molecular formula C_{16}H_{24}O_{4} (molar mass: 280.36 g/mol, exact mass: 280.1675 u) may refer to:

- Brefeldin A
- Fumarranol
