= Tenomodulin =

Protein-coding gene in the species Homo sapiens

TNMD

Identifiers
- Aliases: TNMD, BRICD4, CHM1L, TEM, tenomodulin
- External IDs: OMIM: 300459; MGI: 1929885; GeneCards: TNMD

Gene location (Human)
Chr.	X chromosome (human)
Band	Xq22.1	Start	100,584,936 bp
Band	Xq22.1	End	100,599,885 bp

Gene location (Mouse)
Chr.	X chromosome (mouse)
Band	X|X E3	Start	132,751,729 bp
Band	X|X E3	End	132,766,326 bp
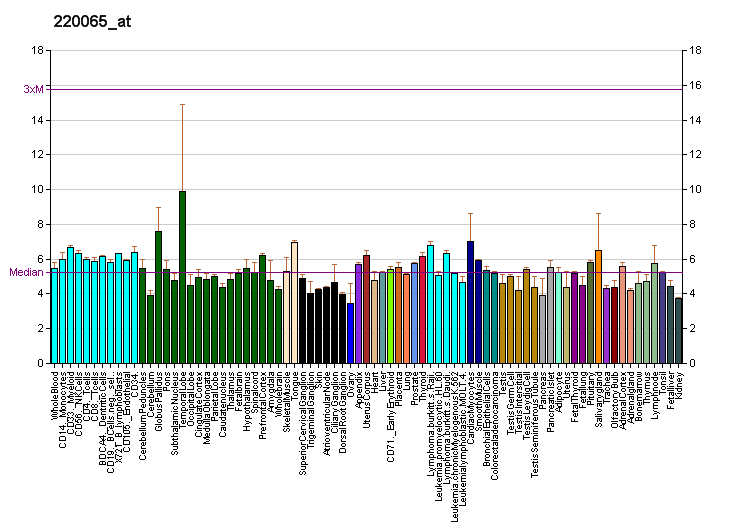
RNA expression pattern
Bgee	Human / Mouse (ortholog); Top expressed in: Achilles tendon; synovial joint; cartilage tissue; adipose tissue; subcutaneous adipose tissue; hair follicle; skin of hip; abdominal fat; lactiferous gland; synovial membrane / Top expressed in: calvaria; soleus muscle; ankle; body of femur; skin of external ear; sternum; trachea; medial head of gastrocnemius muscle; temporal muscle; triceps brachii muscle; More reference expression data
BioGPS	More reference expression data
Gene ontology
Molecular function	protein binding
Cellular component	cytoplasm; integral component of membrane; nuclear envelope; membrane; nucleus
Biological process	negative regulation of angiogenesis; tendon cell differentiation; endothelial cell morphogenesis; cellular response to BMP stimulus; negative regulation of endothelial cell proliferation; negative regulation of vascular endothelial growth factor receptor signaling pathway
Sources:Amigo / QuickGO
Orthologs
Databases	NCBI: entry; OMA: entry
Species	Human	Mouse
Entrez	64102	64103
Ensembl	ENSG00000000005	ENSMUSG00000031250
UniProt	Q9H2S6	Q9EP64
RefSeq (mRNA)	NM_022144	NM_022322
RefSeq (protein)	NP_071427	NP_071717
Location (UCSC)	Chr X: 100.58 – 100.6 Mb	Chr X: 132.75 – 132.77 Mb
PubMed search
- Wikidata
View/Edit Human	View/Edit Mouse

Tenomodulin, also referred to as tendin, myodulin, Tnmd, or TeM, is a protein encoded by the TNMD (Tnmd) gene and was discovered independently by Brandau and Shukunami in 2001 as a gene sharing high similarity with the already known chondromodulin-1 (Chm1). It is a tendon-specific gene marker known to be important for tendon maturation with key implications for the residing tendon stem/progenitor cells (TSPCs) as well as for the regulation of endothelial cell migration in chordae tendineae cordis in the heart and in experimental tumour models. It is highly expressed in tendons, explaining the rationale behind its name and the establishment as being marker gene for tendinous and ligamentous lineages.

== Gene and protein structure ==
TNMD belongs to the new family of type II transmembrane glycoproteins. The gene is localized on the X chromosome and accounts for an approximately 1.4 kb transcript and a predicted protein consisting of 317 amino acids. The gene is composed of seven exons. The second exon encodes the transmembrane domain (amino acid position 31-49) and no signal peptide. TNMD contains a putative protease recognition sequence (Arg-Xxx-Xxx-Arg) identified at the position 233-236. Unlike chondromodulin-1, TNMD does not have a processing signal for furin protease. The extracellular part, prior the putative cleavage site, contains a BRICHOS extracellular domain found also in several other unrelated proteins. This domain consists of a homologous sequence of approximately 100 amino acids containing a pair of conserved cysteine residues. It has been suggested that BRICHOS participates in the protein post-translational processing, however the exact function remains unclear. TNMD contains two N-glycosylation sites at position 94 and 180. Protein analyses in eye and periodontal ligament revealed full length TNMD protein as a double band of 40 and 45 kDa. It has been experimentally proven that the 45 kDa band corresponds to glycosylated TNMD, while 40 kDa band is non-glycosylated TNMD. The last exon of TNMD gene encodes the conserved C-terminal cysteine-rich domain, which makes up the part of the protein sharing highest resemblance to chondromodulin-I (77% similarity/66% identity). This domain contains C-terminal hydrophobic tail with eight Cys residues forming four disulphide-bridges, which are well conserved across vertebrate species. A smaller cyclic structure forming by single Cys280-Cys292 disulphide bridge in TNMD has been shown to exert an anti-angiogenic function, while the other three disulphide-bridges are speculated to hold this cyclic structure and C-terminal hydrophobic tail separated from each other to avoid the formation of intramolecular aggregates. In certain tendon tissues such as Achilles tendon and chordae tendineae cordis, 16 kDa cleaved C-terminal part of TNMD was detected in the collagenous extracellular matrix.

== Expression pattern ==
TNMD is highly expressed on messenger and protein levels in tendons and ligaments, but has also been found in other tissues.

- In tendon development first signals are detectable as early as E9.5, but upregulated from E14.5 onwards, marking the differentiated stage of tendon progenitors.

- Mouse periodontal ligaments demonstrated tenomodulin protein expression at 3 and 4 weeks postnatal, a time period corresponding to molar eruptive and post-eruptive phases when the teeth become functional.

- Other tendinous tissues known to express Tnmd are the diaphragm and chordae tendineae cordis.

- Masseter muscle is compartmentalized by a laminar structure, which was shown to elevate Tnmd mRNA in mouse embryos between E12.5 to E17.5, which further decreased after birth. The epimysium of skeletal muscle is also TNMD -positive.

- Tnmd mRNA was detected in eyes, more specifically in the sclerocornea, tendon of the extraocular muscle and the retinal ganglion cell layer, lens fibre cells, inner nuclear layer cells and pigment epithelium.

- Tnmd mRNA was detected in mouse skin at E15.5 and in human subcutaneous adipose tissue and adipocytes.

- In situ hybridization revealed Tnmd expression in various parts of the adult mouse brain such as the dentate gyrus, CA regions of the hippocampus, neurons in the cerebral nuclei, cerebellum, Purkinje cells and neuronal cells in the cerebellar nucleus.

- Rat mandibular condylar cartilage is positive for Tnmd mRNA at 1 week and is downregulated after 5 weeks.

== Putative signalling pathway ==
The putative signalling pathway of TNMD is largely unknown due to unidentified direct binding partners. Many knockout mouse models with tendon phenotypes have helped in understanding which upstream factors or pathways affect Tnmd expression. Similarly, the generation of Tnmd knockout mouse model allowed the suggestion of possible downstream effectors. Most of the below studies show correlations between Tnmd expression or function to other genes and not a direct link in a common signalling cascade. Regarding upstream regulators of Tnmd expression the description of the scleraxis (Scx) knockout mouse line suggested that Scx can directly drive Tnmd transcription, because Scx deletion led to complete elimination of Tnmd expression. Overexpression of scleraxis in cultured tenocytes or in mesenchymal stem cells significantly upregulated Tnmd expression. The deletion of myostatin in mice resulted in a parallel decrease in Scx and Tnmd mRNA levels, while myostatin stimulation of fibroblasts led to their upregulation, suggesting myostatin as an upstream factor in the Tnmd pathway. Egr1/2 transcription factors can induce Scx and collagen I gene expression, hence it would be interesting to investigate if Egr1 or 2 also can affect Tnmd expression. The absence of the Mohawk (Mkx) gene led to significantly lower Tnmd expression as well as collagen I and fibromodulin. A significant loss of Tnmd was noticeable in Mkx knockouts at E16.5, while Scx expression was unchanged [22], suggesting that Mkx can also directly affect Tnmd expression. Activation of the Wnt/β-catenin signalling pathway in bone marrow-derived stem cells resulted in Tnmd upregulation. Scx and Mkx expression were unaffected, suggesting the Wnt/ β-catenin signalling works independent from these transcription factors. Regarding downstream factors, the Tnmd knockout mouse model suggested correlation to collagen I based on the observed abnormal collagen fibrillogenesis resulting in pathologically thicker fibres. The lower cellular density and proliferation in the mutant tendons, as well as the reduced self-renewal and earlier senescence of Tnmd-deficient tendon stem/progenitor cells was coupled with downregulation of the proliferative marker Cyclin D1 and upregulation of the senescent marker p53. A study analysing ruptures of human chordae tendineae cordis revealed loss of Tnmd expression in the affected area coupled with upregulation of VEGF-A and MMP1, 2 and 13.

== Function and correlation to disease ==
In the last decade major breakthroughs in understanding the roles of TNMD in tendons and other tissues and cells have been made. The exact TNMD functions vary according to the type of cell and tissue, and in great extent they remain still not fully deciphered. Also how precisely TNMD contributes to pathophysiology of some correlated diseases is still unclear.

- In tendons it proves to have beneficial functions for the maintenance of the tissue because its loss results in premature tendon ageing characterized with dysregulated collagen fibrillogenesis and reduced cell density and proliferation. Tnmd exerts a positive effect on tendon-derived stem/progenitor cells by supporting self-renewal and preventing senescence, actions in which the C-terminal cysteine-rich domain alone is sufficient. The first studies on Tnmd expression during tendon healing suggested a time-dependent role, which needs to be further elucidated.

- In periodontal ligaments mediating the teeth connection to the jaw bones, Tnmd contributes to proper fibroblast adhesion.

- In tendinous structures chordae tendineae cordis, which connect papillary muscle to the atrioventricular valves in the heart, local absence of Tnmd leads to enhanced angiogenesis, VEGF-A production and MMPs activation. This is followed by cordis ruptures which can cause mitral regurgitation and cardiac valvular diseases.

- With respect to Tnmd anti-angiogenic function in vivo, no major abnormalities in vessel formation and density were detected during tendon and retina development in the knockout mouse model. The latter finding is open for discussion because a study with recombinant tenomodulin has shown an obliterating vessel effect in retina when injected in vivo in the vitreous body.

- In ectopic tumour in vivo models, induced expression of TNMD in mouse melanoma cells resulted in suppression of tumour growth due to reduced vessel density.

- TNMD transduction in human retinal and umbilical vein endothelial cells resulted in reduced cell proliferation or migration, correspondingly.

- Multiple research studies on cell phenotypisation after gene overexpression, stimulation with growth factors or mechanical stress, tissue engineering and biomaterial evaluation utilize Tnmd expression as marker for tendinous and ligamentous cell lineage.

- Research conducted on a genomic level by single nucleotide polymorphism has presented interesting correlations between Tnmd and a variety of diseases namely obesity, type 2 diabetes, metabolic syndrome, Alzheimer's disease and age-related macular degeneration. How exactly these SNPs affect Tnmd transcription, splicing or protein amino acid sequence remains still unknown.

- A strong correlation between Tnmd mRNA expression and the progression of several diseases such as obesity, metabolic syndrome and juvenile dermatomyositis has been shown. Generally, in all these cases higher tenomodulin levels corresponded to advanced disease state.
