= Methionyl aminopeptidase =

Class of enzymes

Identifiers
- EC no.: 3.4.11.18
- CAS no.: 61229-81-0

Databases
- IntEnz: IntEnz view
- BRENDA: BRENDA entry
- ExPASy: NiceZyme view
- KEGG: KEGG entry
- MetaCyc: metabolic pathway
- PRIAM: profile
- PDB structures: RCSB PDB PDBe PDBsum
Search
- PMC: articles
- PubMed: articles
- NCBI: proteins

Methionyl aminopeptidase (EC 3.4.11.18, methionine aminopeptidase, peptidase M, L-methionine aminopeptidase, MAP) is an enzyme. This enzyme catalyses the following chemical reaction

Release of N-terminal amino acids, preferentially methionine, from peptides and arylamides

This membrane-bound enzymatic activity is present in both prokaryotes and eukaryotes. Human proteins possessing this activity include METAP1, METAP2, METAP1D (mitochondrial), and RNPEPL1.
