= ZGN-1061 =

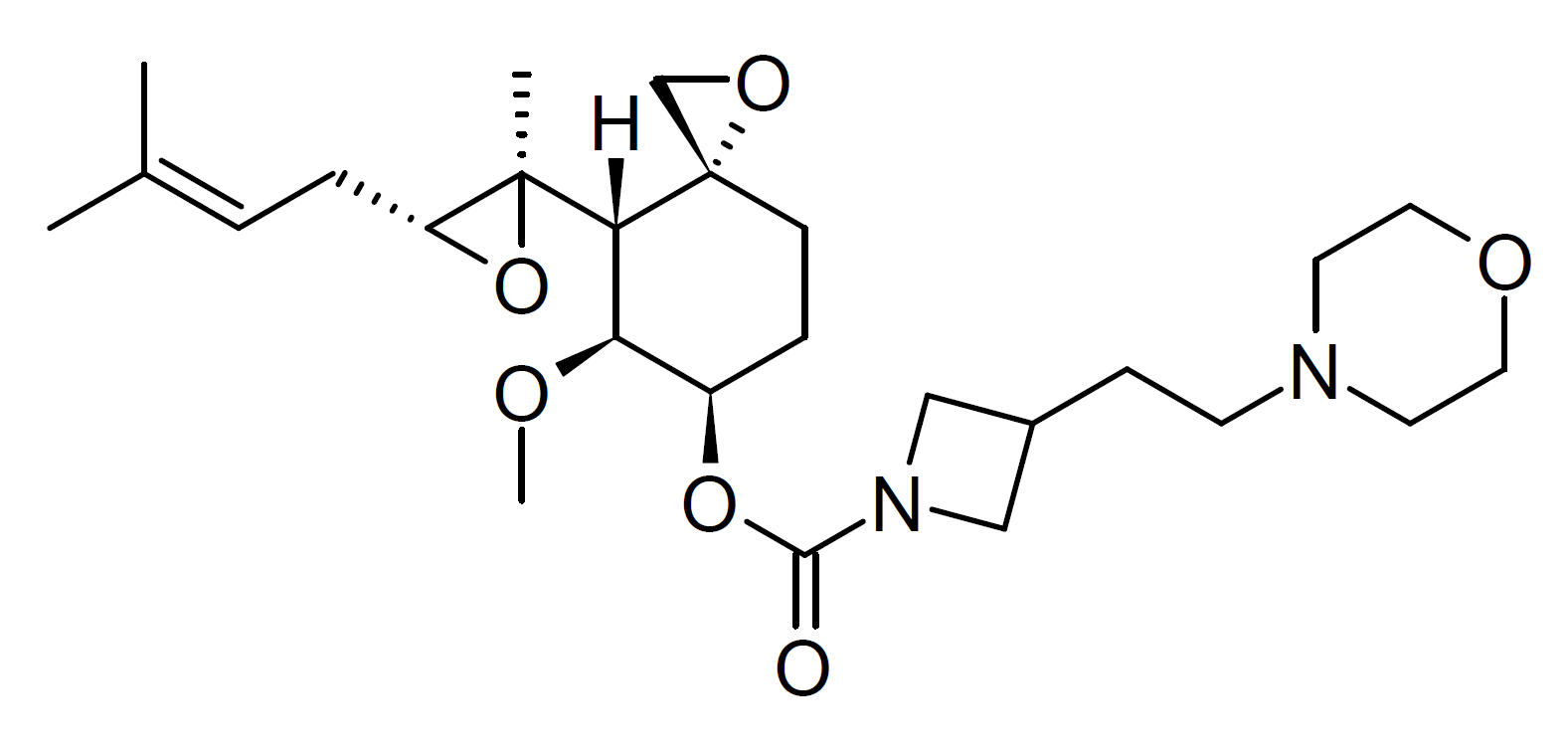

Names
- Preferred IUPAC name [(3R,4S,5S,6R)-5-methoxy-4-[(2R,3R)-2-methyl-3-(3-methylbut-2-enyl)oxiran-2-yl]-1-oxaspiro[2.5]octan-6-yl] 3-(2-morpholin-4-ylethyl)azetidine-1-carboxylate
- Other names ZGN-1061, Aclimostat

Identifiers
CAS Number	2082752-83-6
3D model (JSmol)	Interactive image
ChEMBL	ChEMBL4297651
ChemSpider	81368488
DrugBank	DB16079
PubChem CID	126573394
UNII	X150A3JK8R
- InChI: InChI=1S/C26H42N2O6/c1-18(2)5-6-21-25(3,34-21)23-22(30-4)20(7-9-26(23)17-32-26)33-24(29)28-15-19(16-28)8-10-27-11-13-31-14-12-27/h5,19-23H,6-17H2,1-4H3/t20-,21-,22-,23-,25+,26+/m1/s1 Key: QJWJPMLDQYEPPW-AUKZVGPFSA-N
- SMILES: CC(=CC[C@@H]1[C@@](O1)(C)[C@H]2[C@@H]([C@@H](CC[C@]23CO3)OC(=O)N4CC(C4)CCN5CCOCC5)OC)C

Properties
Chemical formula	C_{26}H_{42}N_{2}O_{6}
Molar mass	478.630 g·mol^{−1}
- Except where otherwise noted, data are given for materials in their standard state (at 25 °C [77 °F], 100 kPa). Infobox references

ZGN-1061 is an experimental drug that was developed by Zafgen for treatment of obesity and type 2 diabetes. It has a similar mechanism of action as the discontinued drug Beloranib but was considered safer; however, its development was also halted because of safety concerns.
