= Cartilage-derived angiogenesis inhibitor =

A cartilage-derived angiogenesis inhibitor is an angiogenesis inhibitor produced from cartilage. Examples include the peptide troponin I and chondromodulin I. The antiangiogenic effect may be an inhibition of basement membrane degradation.

These inhibitory agents prevent 'vascular invasion', which is the proliferation of tumor cells in the blood or lymph vessels. They are usually highly expressed in cartilage and within chondrocytes. Their genetic transcription increases upon the expansion of cartilaginous regions.

Recent studies on Troponin I hypothesize that this protein performs its anti-proliferation effect on endothelial cells via interactions with a bFGF receptor. Neighboring studies on other anti-angiogenic factors are evolving, however, the general mechanism of action is still unknown today.
