= TNP-470 =

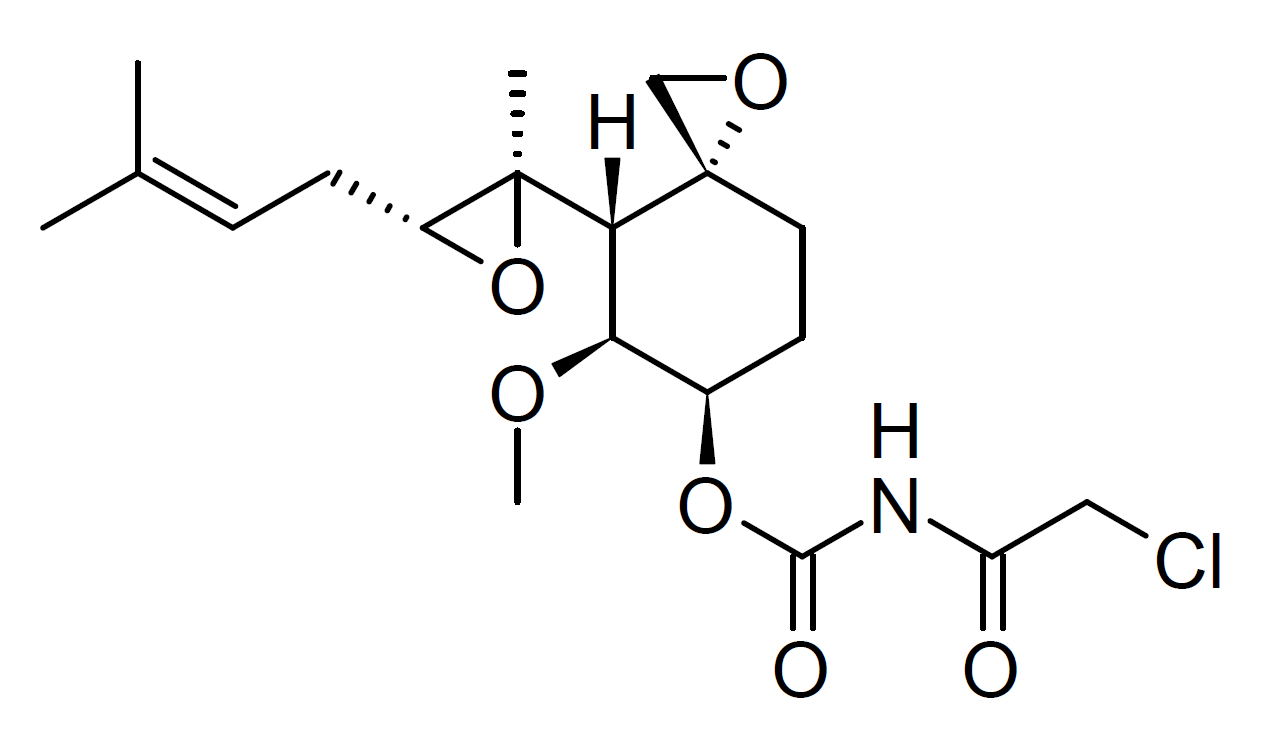

Names
- Preferred IUPAC name [(3R,4S,5S,6R)-5-methoxy-4-[(2R,3R)-2-methyl-3-(3-methylbut-2-enyl)oxiran-2-yl]-1-oxaspiro[2.5]octan-6-yl] N-(2-chloroacetyl)carbamate
- Other names TNP-470, O-(chloroacetylcarbamoyl)fumagillol

Identifiers
CAS Number	129298-91-5
3D model (JSmol)	Interactive image
ChEBI	CHEBI:90748
ChEMBL	ChEMBL424278
ChemSpider	328427
DrugBank	DB08633
ECHA InfoCard	100.189.666
EC Number	663-348-8
PubChem CID	369976
UNII	X47GR46481
CompTox Dashboard (EPA)	DTXSID0041141
- InChI: InChI=1S/C19H28ClNO6/c1-11(2)5-6-13-18(3,27-13)16-15(24-4)12(7-8-19(16)10-25-19)26-17(23)21-14(22)9-20/h5,12-13,15-16H,6-10H2,1-4H3,(H,21,22,23)/t12-,13-,15-,16-,18+,19+/m1/s1 Key: MSHZHSPISPJWHW-PVDLLORBSA-N
- SMILES: CC(=CC[C@@H]1[C@@](O1)(C)[C@H]2[C@@H]([C@@H](CC[C@]23CO3)OC(=O)NC(=O)CCl)OC)C

Properties
Chemical formula	C_{19}H_{28}ClNO_{6}
Molar mass	401.88 g·mol^{−1}
- Except where otherwise noted, data are given for materials in their standard state (at 25 °C [77 °F], 100 kPa). Infobox references

TNP-470 is an methionine aminopeptidase 2 inhibitor. Although it was one of the first angiogenesis inhibitor tested in clinical trials, its potential was hampered by neurotoxic effects and lack of effectiveness.
