= Adriana Albini =

Italian cancer researcher, fencer and writer

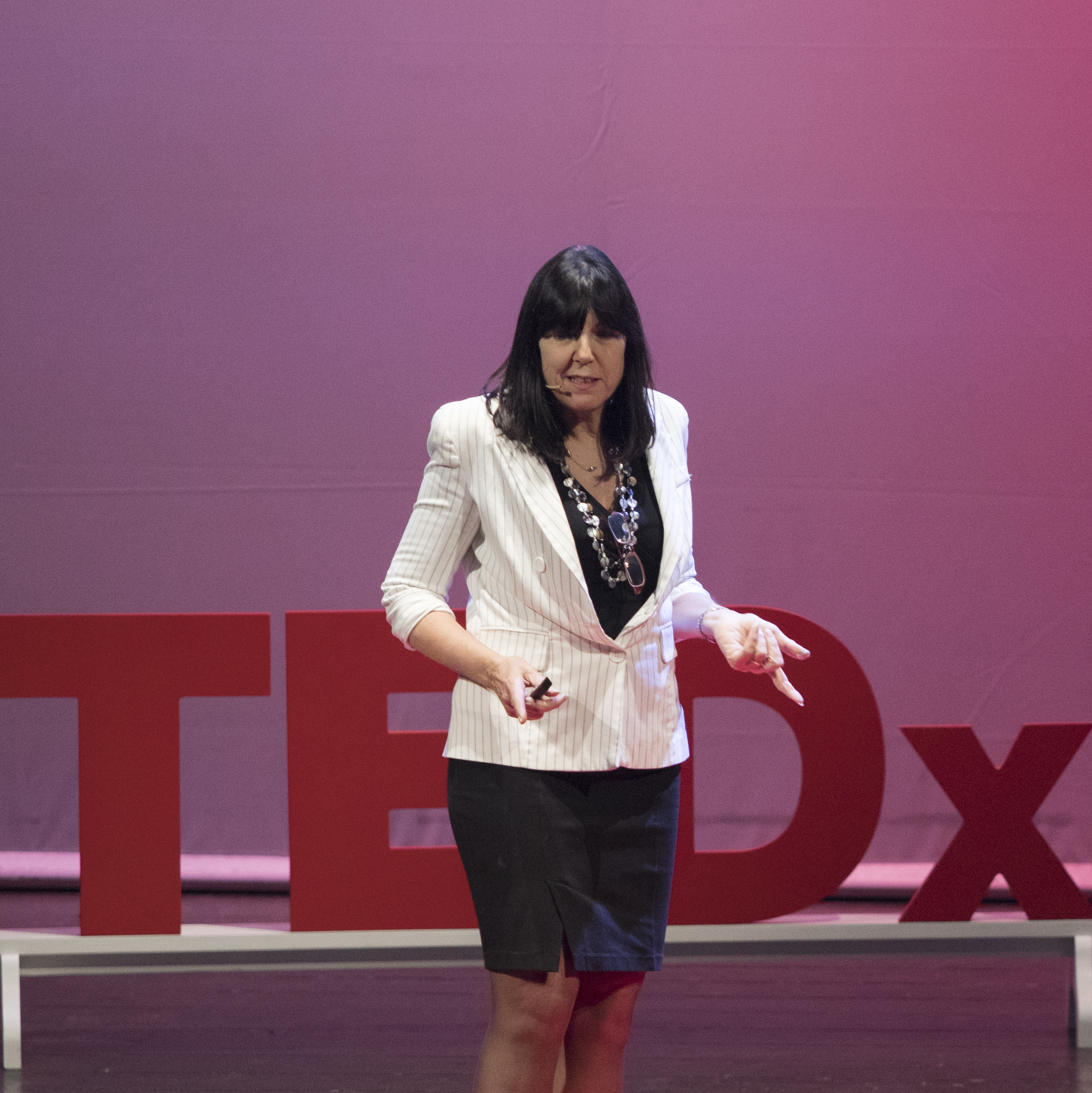
- at TEDx Foggia in 2018
- Born: 2 September 1955 (age 70); Venezia, Italy
- Occupation: Scientific director
- Employer: Fondazione MultiMedica Onlus
- Known for: angioprevention

Adriana Albini (born 1955) is an Italian pathologist and cancer researcher. She developed the concept of angioprevention which can be used to control cancer development. She is a competitive fencer and six of her novels have been published. In 2000 she was the Scientific Director at the Fondazione MultiMedica Onlus in Milan.

== Life ==
Albini was born in Venice, Italy, on 2 September 1955.

In 1985 she had her doctorate and she was employed in research at the Max-Planck Institute for Biochemistry.

She works in Milan at the Fondazione MultiMedica Onlus where she is the Scientific Director. She has developed the concept of Angioprevention. Angiogenesis is the name given to the process of forming blood vessels and therefore preventing this process from operating could be used to prevent disease development . Albini and others have shown that several drugs and natural compounds for cancer chemo-prevention (or chemoprophylaxis) actually prevent tumor blood vessel formation. Her concept has been furthered through the identification of many other "angiopreventive" compounds.

Albini was the first Italian to serve on the council of the American Association for Cancer Research. In 2014 the Provincial Council of Brescia awarded her the ''Donne Che Ce L’hanno Fatta'' (Women Who Made It) award. The following year she was given a Special Recognition Award by the European Union Women Inventors and Innovators Network International (EUWIIN). In 2020 Albini was identified as one of the BBC's 100 Women.

== Other interests ==
Albini has written six novels under a pen name. She is also a competitive fencer and in May 2015 she won the silver medal at the 2015 European Veteran Fencing championship in her age class behind Marja-Liisa Someroja of Finland.
