= Methionine aminopeptidase 1 =

Enzyme found in humans

METAP1
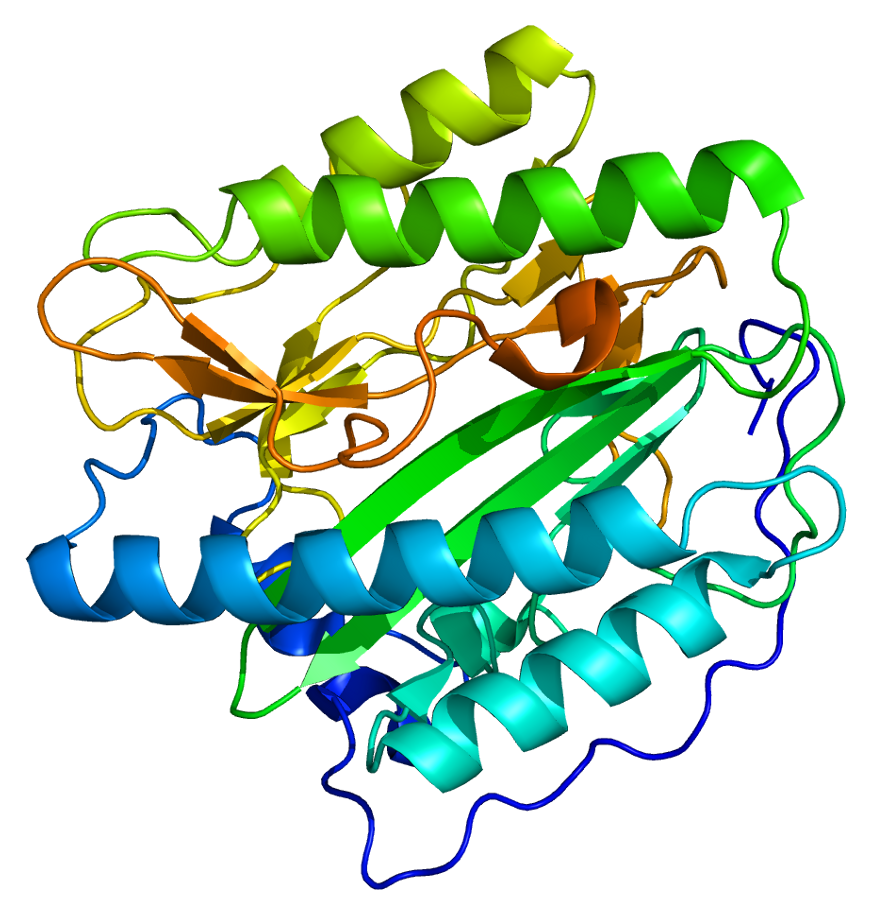

Identifiers
- Aliases: METAP1, MAP1A, MetAP1A, methionyl aminopeptidase 1
- External IDs: OMIM: 610151; MGI: 1922874; GeneCards: METAP1
Available structures
PDB	Ortholog search: PDBe RCSB
PDB	List of PDB id codes 2B3H, 2B3K, 2B3L, 2G6P, 2GZ5, 2NQ6, 2NQ7, 4FLI, 4FLJ, 4FLK, 4FLL, 4HXX, 4IKR, 4IKS, 4IKT, 4IKU, 4IU6, 4U1B, 4U69, 4U6C, 4U6E, 4U6J, 4U6W, 4U6Z, 4U70, 4U71, 4U73, 4U75, 4U76
Enzyme activity
EC #	BRENDA	ExPASy	KEGG	MetaCyc
3.4.11.18	↗	↗	↗	↗

Gene location (Human)
Chr.	Chromosome 4 (human)
Band	4q23	Start	98,995,620 bp
Band	4q23	End	99,062,813 bp

Gene location (Mouse)
Chr.	Chromosome 3 (mouse)
Band	3|3 G3	Start	138,164,717 bp
Band	3|3 G3	End	138,195,276 bp
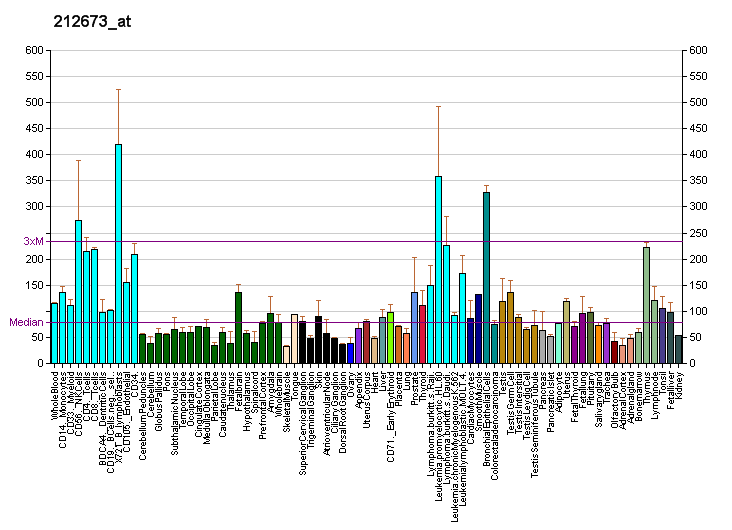
RNA expression pattern
Bgee	Human / Mouse (ortholog); Top expressed in: left testis; right testis; endometrium; Descending thoracic aorta; epithelium of nasopharynx; rectum; urinary bladder; gingival epithelium; hair follicle; oral cavity / Top expressed in: primitive streak; lens; vastus lateralis muscle; triceps brachii muscle; sternocleidomastoid muscle; temporal muscle; hair follicle; crypt of lieberkuhn of small intestine; digastric muscle; ciliary body; More reference expression data
BioGPS	More reference expression data
Gene ontology
Molecular function	peptidase activity; aminopeptidase activity; metalloexopeptidase activity; hydrolase activity; metal ion binding
Cellular component	cytosol; cytoplasm
Biological process	peptidyl-methionine modification; platelet aggregation; N-terminal protein amino acid modification; regulation of translation; proteolysis; regulation of rhodopsin mediated signaling pathway
Sources:Amigo / QuickGO
Orthologs
Databases	NCBI: entry; OMA: entry
Species	Human	Mouse
Entrez	23173	75624
Ensembl	ENSG00000164024	ENSMUSG00000005813
UniProt	P53582	Q8BP48
RefSeq (mRNA)	NM_015143	NM_175224
RefSeq (protein)	NP_055958	NP_780433
Location (UCSC)	Chr 4: 99 – 99.06 Mb	Chr 3: 138.16 – 138.2 Mb
PubMed search
- Wikidata
View/Edit Human	View/Edit Mouse

Methionine aminopeptidase 1 is an enzyme that in humans is encoded by the METAP1 gene. This enzyme is a methionyl aminopeptidase which cleaves the N-terminal methionine from precursor proteins, with particular affinity for when the second amino acid is small and non-charged. Also important for the normal functioning of the cell cycle. This enzyme uses metal cations as a cofactor (making it a metalloprotein), but which one is used in the body remains debated.

== See also ==
- Methionine aminopeptidase 2
