= Methionine aminopeptidase 2 =

Enzyme found in humans

METAP2
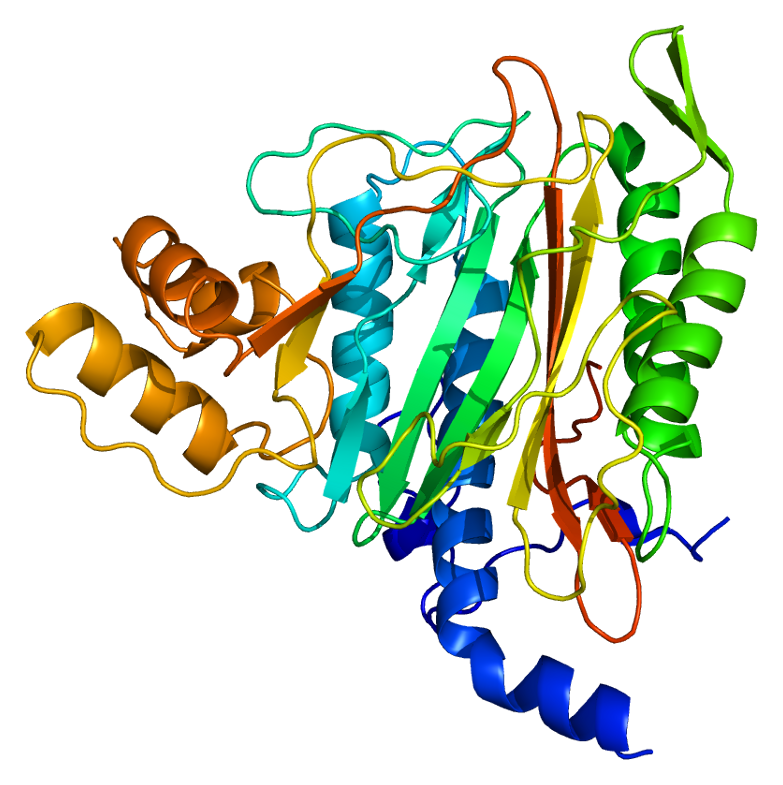

Identifiers
- Aliases: METAP2, MAP2, MNPEP, p67, p67eIF2, methionyl aminopeptidase 2
- External IDs: OMIM: 601870; MGI: 1929701; GeneCards: METAP2
Available structures
PDB	Ortholog search: PDBe RCSB
PDB	List of PDB id codes 1B59, 1B6A, 1BN5, 1BOA, 1KQ0, 1KQ9, 1QZY, 1R58, 1R5G, 1R5H, 1YW7, 1YW8, 1YW9, 2ADU, 2EA2, 2EA4, 2GA2, 2OAZ, 5CLS, 5D6E, 5D6F, 5JFR, 5JHU, 5JI6
Enzyme activity
EC #	BRENDA	ExPASy	KEGG	MetaCyc
3.4.11.18	↗	↗	↗	↗

Gene location (Human)
Chr.	Chromosome 12 (human)
Band	12q22	Start	95,473,520 bp
Band	12q22	End	95,515,839 bp

Gene location (Mouse)
Chr.	Chromosome 10 (mouse)
Band	10|10 C2	Start	93,694,351 bp
Band	10|10 C2	End	93,732,955 bp
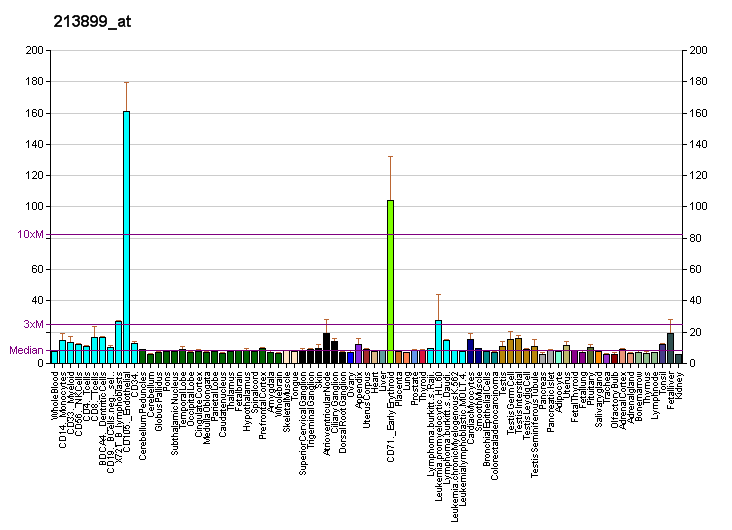

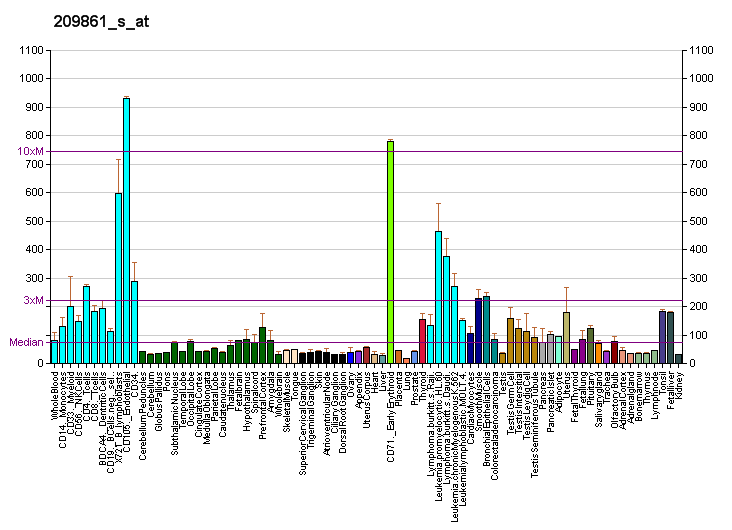
RNA expression pattern
Bgee	Human / Mouse (ortholog); Top expressed in: sural nerve; seminal vesicula; Achilles tendon; tendon of biceps brachii; trabecular bone; oral cavity; secondary oocyte; ganglionic eminence; endometrium; epithelium of colon / Top expressed in: neural layer of retina; tail of embryo; genital tubercle; muscle of thigh; yolk sac; morula; ventricular zone; embryo; spermatid; spermatocyte; More reference expression data
BioGPS	More reference expression data
Gene ontology
Molecular function	peptidase activity; metalloexopeptidase activity; hydrolase activity; metal ion binding; aminopeptidase activity; RNA binding; metalloaminopeptidase activity
Cellular component	cytoplasm; plasma membrane; cytosol
Biological process	peptidyl-methionine modification; protein processing; N-terminal protein amino acid modification; proteolysis; regulation of rhodopsin mediated signaling pathway; protein initiator methionine removal
Sources:Amigo / QuickGO
Orthologs
Databases	NCBI: entry; OMA: entry
Species	Human	Mouse
Entrez	10988	56307
Ensembl	ENSG00000111142	ENSMUSG00000036112
UniProt	P50579	O08663
RefSeq (mRNA)	NM_006838; NM_001317182; NM_001317183; NM_001330246	NM_019648
RefSeq (protein)	NP_001304111; NP_001304112; NP_001317175; NP_006829	NP_062622
Location (UCSC)	Chr 12: 95.47 – 95.52 Mb	Chr 10: 93.69 – 93.73 Mb
PubMed search
- Wikidata
View/Edit Human	View/Edit Mouse

Methionine aminopeptidase 2 is an enzyme that in humans is encoded by the METAP2 gene.

Methionine aminopeptidase 2, a member of the dimetallohydrolase family, is a cytosolic metalloenzyme that catalyzes the hydrolytic removal of N-terminal methionine residues from nascent proteins.

- peptide-methionine $\rightleftharpoons$ peptide + methionine

MetAP2 is found in all organisms and is especially important because of its critical role in tissue repair and protein degradation. Furthermore, MetAP2 is of particular interest because the enzyme plays a key role in angiogenesis, the growth of new blood vessels, which is necessary for the progression of diseases including solid tumor cancers and rheumatoid arthritis. MetAP2 is also the target of two groups of anti-angiogenic natural products, ovalicin and fumagillin, and their analogs such as beloranib.

== Structure ==
In living organisms, the start codon that initiates protein synthesis codes for either methionine (eukaryotes) or formylmethionine (prokaryotes). In E. coli (prokaryote), an enzyme called formylmethionine deformylase can cleave the formyl group, leaving just the N-terminal methionine residue. For proteins with small, uncharged penultimate N-terminal residues, a methionine aminopeptidase can cleave the methionine residue. The number of genes encoding for a methionine aminopeptidase varies between organisms. In E. coli, there is only one known MetAP, a 29,333 Da monomeric enzyme coded for by a gene consisting of 264 codons. The knockout of this gene in E. coli leads to cell inviability. In humans, there are two genes encoding MetAP, METAP1 and METAP2. METAP1 codes for a 42 kDa enzyme, while METAP2 codes for a 67 kDa enzyme. Yeast MetAP1 is 40 percent homologous to E. coli MetAP; within S. cerevisiae, MetAP2 is 22 percent homologous with the sequence of MetAP1; MetAP2 is highly conserved between S. cerevisiae and humans. In contrast to prokaryotes, eukaryotic S. cerevisiae strains lacking the gene for either MetAP1 or MetAP2 are viable, but exhibit a slower growth rate than a control strain expressing both genes.

Figure 1. Active site structure of MetAP2. Generated using PDB:1BOA in PyMol. Click to view rotatable structure

=== Active site ===
The active site of MetAP2 has a structural motif characteristic of many metalloenzymes—including the dioxygen carrier protein, hemerythrin; the dinuclear non-heme iron protein, ribonucleotide reductase; leucine aminopeptidase; urease; arginase; several phosphatases and phosphoesterases—that includes two bridging carboxylate ligands and a bridging water or hydroxide ligand. Specifically in human MetAP2 (PDB: 1BOA), one of the catalytic metal ions is bound to His331, Glu364, Glu459, Asp263, and a bridging water or hydroxide, while the other metal ion is bound to Asp251 (bidentate), App262 (bidentate), Glu459, and the same bridging water or hydroxide. Here, the two bridging carboxylates are Asp262 and Glu459.

=== Dimetal center ===
The identity of the active site metal ions under physiological conditions has not been successfully established, and remains a controversial issue. MetAP2 shows activity in the presence of Zn(II), Co(II), Mn(II), and Fe(II) ions, and various authors have argued any given metal ion is the physiological one: some in the presence of iron, others in cobalt, others in manganese, and yet others in the presence of zinc. Nonetheless, the majority of crystallographers have crystallized MetAP2 either in the presence of Zn(II) or Co(II) (see PDB database).

== Mechanism ==
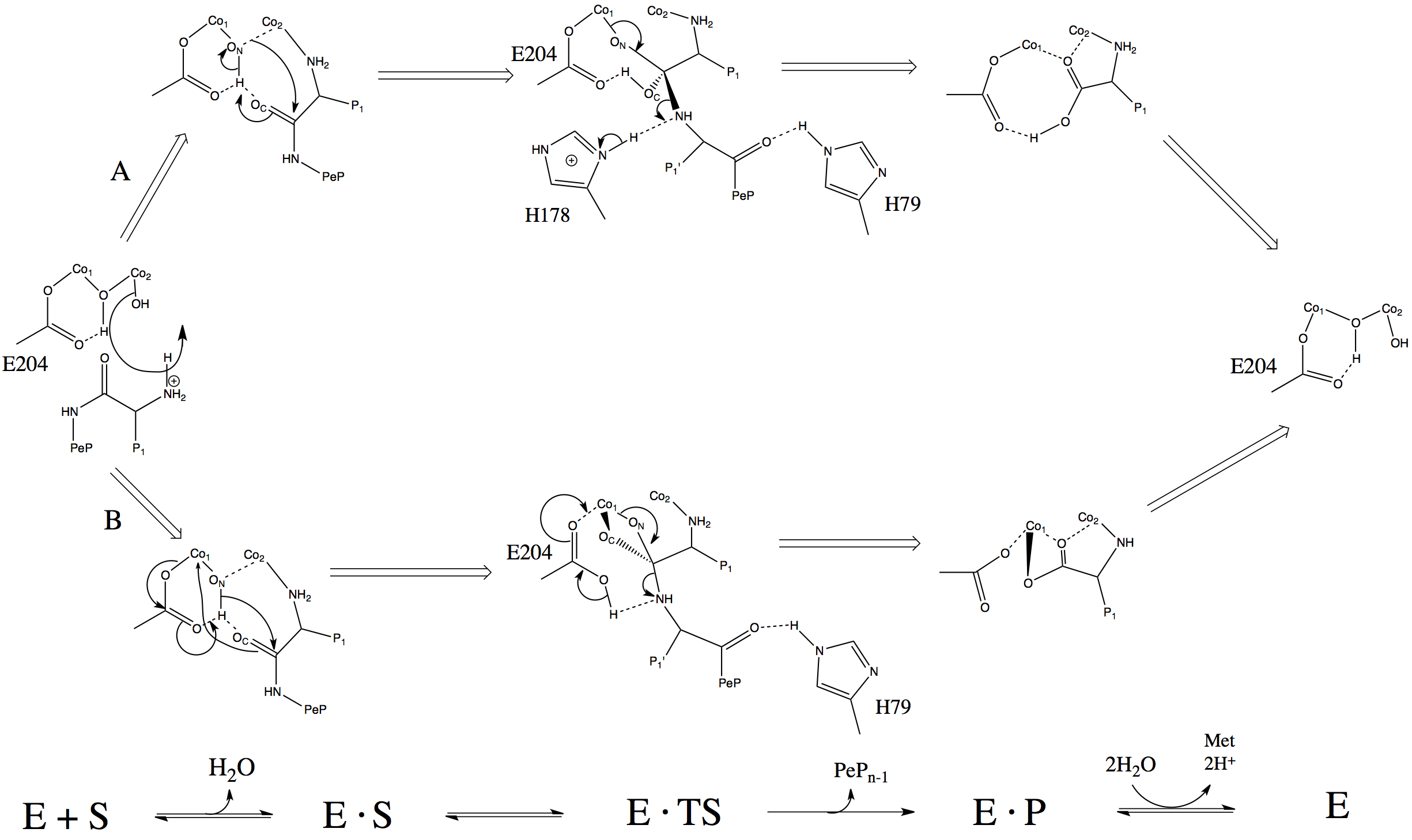
Figure 2. Two proposed reaction mechanisms for MetAP in E. coli. (A) Tetrahedral intermediate stabilized by Glu204 and metal center. (B) Tetrahedral intermediate stabilized His178 and metal center.

The bridging water or hydroxide ligand acts as a nucleophile during the hydrolysis reaction, but the exact mechanism of catalysis is not yet known. The catalytic mechanisms of hydrolase enzymes depend greatly on the identity of the bridging ligand, which can be challenging to determine due to the difficulty of studying hydrogen atoms via x-ray crystallography.

The histidine residues shown in the mechanism to the right, H178 and H79, are conserved in all MetAPs (MetAP1s and MetAP2s) sequenced to date, suggesting their presence is important to catalytic activity. Based upon X-ray crystallographic data, histidine 79 (H79) has been proposed to help position the methionine residue in the active site and transfer a proton to the newly exposed N-terminal amine. Lowther and Colleagues have proposed two possible mechanisms for MetAP2 in E. coli, shown at the right.

== Function ==
While previous studies have indicated MetAP2 catalyzes the removal of N-terminal methionine residues in vitro, the function of this enzyme in vivo may be more complex. For example, a significant correlation exists between the inhibition of the enzymatic activity of MetAP2 and inhibition of cell growth, thus implicating the enzyme in endothelial cell proliferation. For this reason, cancer researchers have singled out MetAP2 as a potential target for the inhibition of angiogenesis. Moreover, studies have demonstrated that MetAP2 copurifies and interacts with the α subunit of eukaryotic initiation factor 2 (eIF2), a protein that is necessary for protein synthesis in vivo. Specifically, MetAP2 protects eIF-2α from inhibitory phosphorylation from the enzyme eIF-2α kinase, inhibits RNA-dependent protein kinase (PKR)-catalyzed eIF-2 R-subunit phosphorylation, and also reverses PKR-mediated inhibition of protein synthesis in intact cells.

== Clinical significance ==
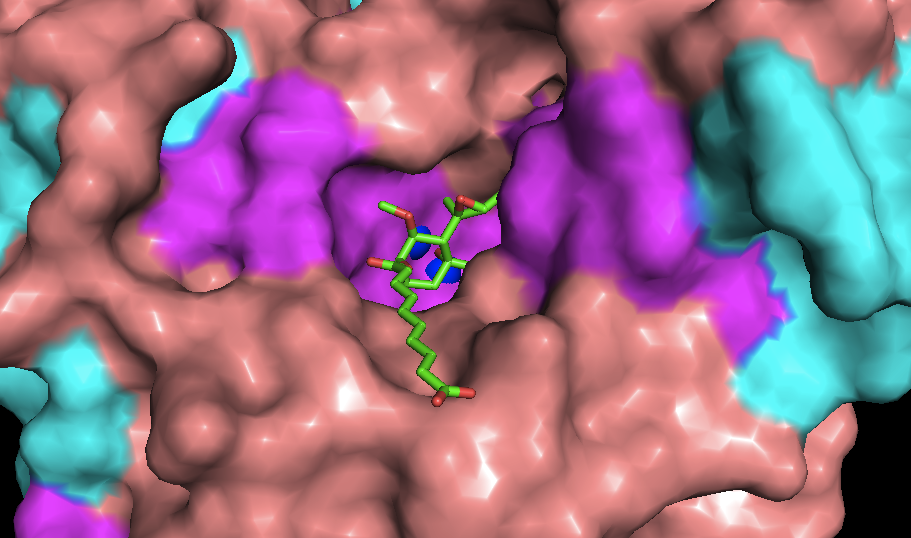
Figure 3. Fumagillin (green and red) bound to human MetAP2 active site (multicolored, with cyan, purple, and pink corresponding to helices, sheets, and loops, respectively), with dimetal ions (blue) shown.

Numerous studies implicate MetAP2 in angiogenesis. Specifically, the covalent binding of either the ovalicin or fumagillin epoxide moiety to the active site histidine residue of MetAP2 has been shown to inactivate the enzyme, thereby inhibiting angiogenesis. The way in which MetAP2 regulates angiogenesis has yet to be established, however, such that further study is required to validate that antiangiogenic activity results directly from MetAP2 inhibition. Nevertheless, with both the growth and metastasis of solid tumors depending heavily on angiogenesis, fumagillin and its analogs—including evexomostat, TNP-470, caplostatin, and beloranib—as well as ovalicin represent potential anticancer agents. Moreover, the ability of MetAP2 to decrease cell viability in prokaryotic and small eukaryotic organisms has made it a target for antibacterial agents. Thus far, both fumagillin and TNP-470 have been shown to possess antimalarial activity both in vitro and in vivo, and fumarranol, another fumagillin analog, represents a promising lead.

The fumagillin-derived METAP2 inhibitor beloranib (ZGN-433, CDK-732) has shown efficacy in reducing weight in severely obese subjects. MetAP2 inhibitors work by re-establishing insulin sensitivity and balance to the ways the body metabolizes fat, leading to substantial loss of body weight. Development of beloranib was halted in 2016 after two deaths during clinical trials for patients with Praeder-Willi Syndrome.

Evexomostat (SDX-7320) a polymer–drug conjugate of SDX-7539, a MetAP2 inhibitor, is undergoing phase 2 clinical studies

== Interactions ==
METAP2 has been shown to interact with Protein kinase R.
