= Beloranib =

Names
- Preferred IUPAC name (3R,4S,5S,6R)-5-Methoxy-4-[(2R,3R)-2-methyl-3-(3-methylbut-2-en-1-yl)oxiran-2-yl]-1-oxaspiro[2.5]octan-6-yl (2E)-3-{4-[2-(dimethylamino)ethoxy]phenyl}prop-2-enoate
- Other names CKD-732; ZGN-433

Identifiers
| CAS Number | 251111-30-5; 529511-79-3 (hemioxalate) |
| 3D model (JSmol) | Interactive image |
| ChemSpider | 5293699 |
| PubChem CID | 6918502 |
| UNII | FI471K8BU6; 4T7B8LC5I7 (hemioxalate) |
| CompTox Dashboard (EPA) | DTXSID40179800 |
- InChI: InChI=1S/C29H41NO6/c1-20(2)7-13-24-28(3,36-24)27-26(32-6)23(15-16-29(27)19-34-29)35-25(31)14-10-21-8-11-22(12-9-21)33-18-17-30(4)5/h7-12,14,23-24,26-27H,13,15-19H2,1-6H3/b14-10+/t23-,24-,26-,27-,28+,29+/m1/s1 Key: ZEZFKUBILQRZCK-MJSCXXSSSA-N; InChI=1/C29H41NO6/c1-20(2)7-13-24-28(3,36-24)27-26(32-6)23(15-16-29(27)19-34-29)35-25(31)14-10-21-8-11-22(12-9-21)33-18-17-30(4)5/h7-12,14,23-24,26-27H,13,15-19H2,1-6H3/b14-10+/t23-,24-,26-,27-,28+,29+/m1/s1 Key: ZEZFKUBILQRZCK-MJSCXXSSBU
- SMILES: O=C(O[C@H]2[C@@H](OC)[C@@H]([C@]1(OC1)CC2)[C@]3(O[C@@H]3C\C=C(/C)C)C)\C=C\c4ccc(OCCN(C)C)cc4

Properties
| Chemical formula | C_{29}H_{41}NO_{6} |
| Molar mass | 499.648 g·mol^{−1} |
- Except where otherwise noted, data are given for materials in their standard state (at 25 °C [77 °F], 100 kPa). verify (what is ?) Infobox references

Beloranib is a former drug candidate for the treatment of obesity. It was discovered by CKD Pharmaceuticals and its clinical development was led by Zafgen. Drug development was halted in 2016 after deaths during clinical trials.

== Mechanism of action ==
Beloranib, an analog of the natural chemical compound fumagillin, is an inhibitor of the enzyme METAP2. It was originally designed as angiogenesis inhibitor for the treatment of cancer. However, once the potential anti-obesity effects of METAP2 inhibition became apparent, the clinical development began to focus on these effects and beloranib has shown positive results in preliminary clinical trials for this indication.

== Clinical trials ==
A Phase I trial was published in 2013, finding a dose that led to weight loss in obese women in comparison to placebo. Results from a Phase II clinical trial for obesity were promising with clinically meaningful weight loss and improvements in cardiometabolic risk factors in the treated group. Zafgen continued with a Phase III trial for Prader–Willi syndrome.

In December 2015, Zafgen halted the Phase III clinical trial of beloranib for Prader–Willi syndrome after a second patient death in order to determine whether the deaths were treatment-related. After discussions with the Food and Drug Administration indicated that the obstacles to gaining approval were insurmountable, product development for beloranib was ended.
