= Carboxyamidotriazole =

Names
- Preferred IUPAC name 5-Amino-1-{[3,5-dichloro-4-(4-chlorobenzoyl)phenyl]methyl}-1H-1,2,3-triazole-4-carboxamide

Identifiers
CAS Number	99519-84-3
3D model (JSmol)	Interactive image
ChemSpider	97232
ECHA InfoCard	100.231.281
EC Number	804-580-3
PubChem CID	108144
UNII	6ST3ZF52WB
CompTox Dashboard (EPA)	DTXSID40244108
- InChI: InChI=1S/C17H12Cl3N5O2/c18-10-3-1-9(2-4-10)15(26)13-11(19)5-8(6-12(13)20)7-25-16(21)14(17(22)27)23-24-25/h1-6H,7,21H2,(H2,22,27) Key: WNRZHQBJSXRYJK-UHFFFAOYSA-N; InChI=1/C17H12Cl3N5O2/c18-10-3-1-9(2-4-10)15(26)13-11(19)5-8(6-12(13)20)7-25-16(21)14(17(22)27)23-24-25/h1-6H,7,21H2,(H2,22,27) Key: WNRZHQBJSXRYJK-UHFFFAOYAY
- SMILES: C1=CC(=CC=C1C(=O)C2=C(C=C(C=C2Cl)CN3C(=C(N=N3)C(=O)N)N)Cl)Cl

Properties
Chemical formula	C_{17}H_{12}Cl_{3}N_{5}O_{2}
Molar mass	424.66848
- Except where otherwise noted, data are given for materials in their standard state (at 25 °C [77 °F], 100 kPa). verify (what is ?) Infobox references

Carboxyamidotriazole is a calcium channel blocker that blocks voltage-gated and ligand-gated calcium channels and has been investigated as an anti-cancer drug in vitro.
