= Endothelial cell anergy =

Defense mechanism of tumors against immunity

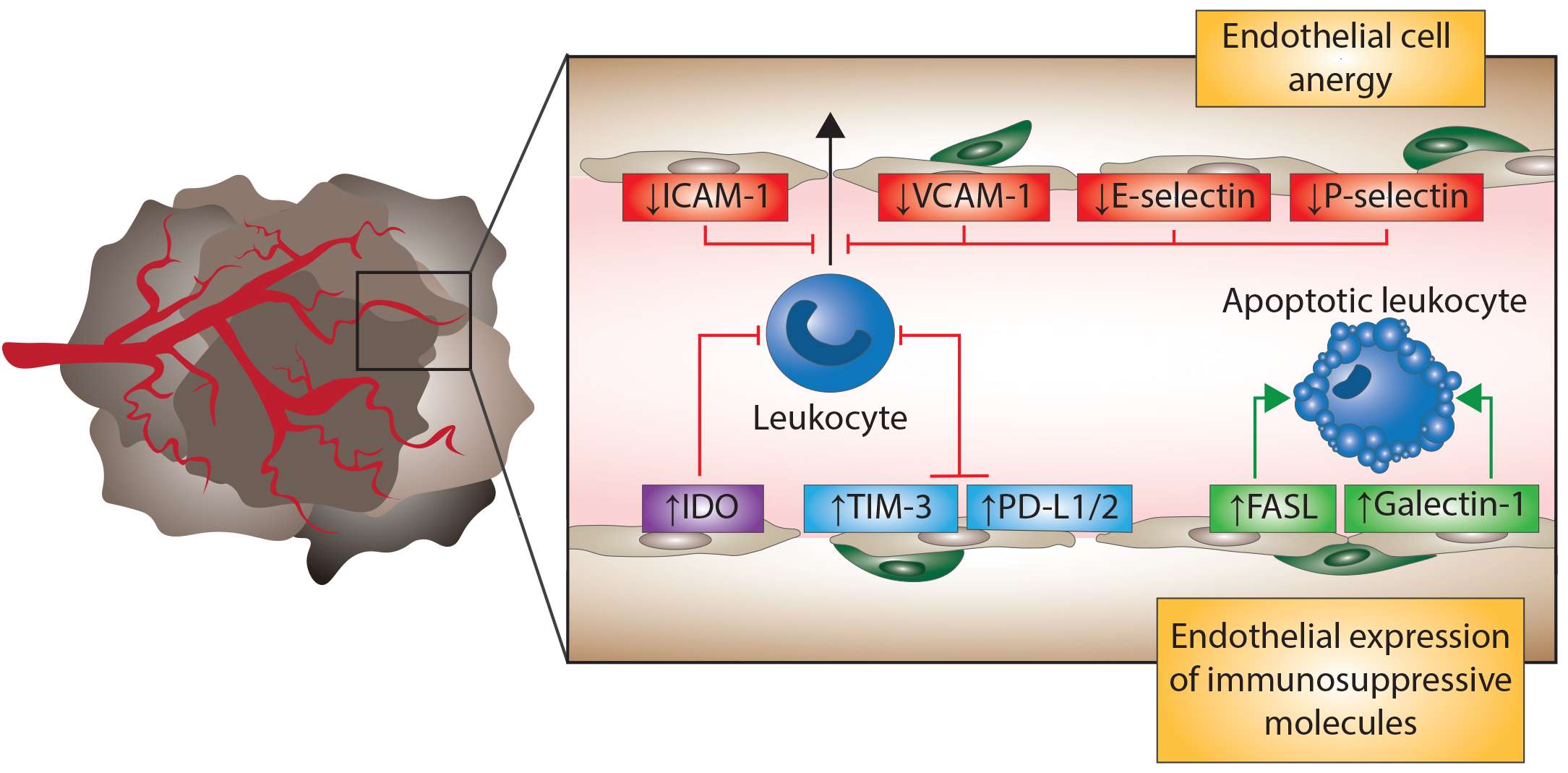
Vasculature-based immune suppression mechanisms. Tumor endothelial cell anergy is represented by the suppression of endothelial adhesion molecules, such as ICAM-1, VCAM-1 and E-selectin. The tumor vasculature contributes to more immune suppression through enhanced expression of immune checkpoint molecules, such as PD-L1 and IDO, that suppress the function of leukocytes. In addition, the tumor vasculature expresses molecules, such as FASL and galectin-1, that can give death signals to leukocytes.

Endothelial cell anergy is a condition during the process of angiogenesis, where endothelial cells, the cells that line the inside of blood vessels, can no longer respond to inflammatory cytokines. These cytokines are necessary to induce the expression of cell adhesion molecules to allow leukocyte infiltration from the blood into the tissue at places of inflammation, such as a tumor. This condition, which protects the tumor from the immune system, is the result of exposure to angiogenic growth factors.

Next to endothelial cell anergy, there are more vascular mechanisms that contribute to escape from immunity, such as the expression of immune checkpoint molecules (e.g. PD-L1/2) and proteins that can deliver death signals in leukocytes (Fas ligand and galectin-1).

== Leukocyte infiltration ==
The formation of a leukocyte infiltrate at places of inflammation is dependent on the interaction of leukocytes in the blood with the vascular wall. This interaction and leukocyte extravasation is mediated by cell adhesion molecules on both leukocytes and endothelium. The endothelial cells normally express low levels of adhesion molecules, but at places of inflammation these adhesion molecules become expressed due to the exposure to inflammatory cytokines, such as interleukin 1, interferon gamma and tumor necrosis factor alpha.

== Angiogenesis blocks leukocyte infiltration ==
Endothelial cell anergy was first described in 1996 when it was shown that endothelial cells in a tumor are not able to upregulate the expression of adhesion molecules, such as intercellular adhesion molecule-1 (ICAM-1, CD54), vascular cell adhesion molecule-1 (VCAM-1, CD106) and E-selectin (CD62E), as a result from exposure angiogenic stimulation by e.g. vascular endothelial growth factor (VEGF) or fibroblast growth factor (FGF). The result of endothelial cell anergy in a tumor is that leukocytes will not be able to reach the tumor, resulting in hampering of the anti-tumor immune response. Next to induction of endothelial cell anergy, ongoing angiogenesis is immunosuppressive at multiple levels.

== Anti-angiogenesis overcomes endothelial cell anergy and improves immunotherapy ==
Since this form of immune suppression is mediated by angiogenic stimulation, it was shown that anti-angiogenic therapy could revert endothelial cell anergy, allow leukocytes to infiltrate tumors and stimulate anti-tumor immunity. Overcoming endothelial cell anergy underlies the current success of clinical treatment of cancer with a combination of anti-angiogenic therapy and immunotherapy, mainly immune checkpoint blockade.

== An embryonic program ==
It has been suggested that endothelial cell anergy also occurs during embryonic stages to allow efficient development of the embryo under immune silent conditions and help protecting the embryo from the maternal immune response. Tumors have hijacked this process to grow under the support of endothelial cell anergy mediated immune suppression.

== History ==
The concept of endothelial cell anergy was introduced by Griffioen and coworkers in 1996.
