= Fumagillin =

Chemical compound

Clinical data
- AHFS/Drugs.com: International Drug Names
- Routes of administration: oral
- ATC code: P01AX10 (WHO) QP51AX23 (WHO)

Identifiers
- IUPAC name: (2E,4E,6E,8E)-10-{[(3R,4S,5S,6R)-5-methoxy- 4-[(2R)-2-methyl-3-(3-methylbut-2-enyl)oxiran-2-yl]-1- oxaspiro[2.5]octan-6-yl]oxy}-10 -oxodeca-2,4,6,8-tetraenoic acid
- CAS Number: 23110-15-8
- PubChem CID: 6917655
- DrugBank: DB02640
- ChemSpider: 5292885
- UNII: 7OW73204U1
- ChEBI: CHEBI:48635
- ChEMBL: ChEMBL32838
- CompTox Dashboard (EPA): DTXSID7040736
- ECHA InfoCard: 100.041.288

Chemical and physical data
- Formula: C_{26}H_{34}O_{7}
- Molar mass: 458.551 g·mol^{−1}
- 3D model (JSmol): Interactive image
- SMILES: CC(=CC[C@@H]1[C@@](O1)(C)[C@H]2[C@@H]([C@@H](CC[C@]23CO3)OC(=O)/C=C/C=C/C=C/C=C/C(=O)O)OC)C
- InChI: InChI=1S/C26H34O7/c1-18(2)13-14-20-25(3,33-20)24-23(30-4)19(15-16-26(24)17-31-26)32-22(29)12-10-8-6-5-7-9-11-21(27)28/h5-13,19-20,23-24H,14-17H2,1-4H3,(H,27,28)/b7-5+,8-6+,11-9+,12-10+/t19-,20-,23-,24-,25+,26+/m1/s1; Key:NGGMYCMLYOUNGM-CSDLUJIJSA-N

Fumagillin is a complex biomolecule and used as an antimicrobial agent. It was isolated in 1949 from the microbial organism Aspergillus fumigatus.

== Uses ==
=== In animals ===
It was originally used against microsporidian parasites Nosema apis infections in honey bees.

Some studies found it to be effective against some myxozoan parasites, including Myxobolus cerebralis, an important parasite of fish; however, in the more rigorous tests required for U.S. Food and Drug Administration approval, it was ineffective.

There are reports that fumagillin controls Nosema ceranae, which has recently been hypothesized as a possible cause of colony collapse disorder. The latest report, however, has shown it to be ineffective against N. ceranae. Fumagillin is also investigated as an inhibitor of malaria parasite growth.

=== In humans ===
Fumagillin has been used orally in the treatment of microsporidiosis. It is also an amebicide.

Fumagillin can block blood vessel formation by binding to an enzyme methionine aminopeptidase 2 and for this reason, the compound, together with semisynthetic derivatives, are investigated as an angiogenesis inhibitor in the treatment of cancer.

The company Zafgen conducted clinical trials using the fumagillin analog beloranib for weight loss, but they were unsuccessful.

Fumagillin is toxic to erythrocytes in vitro at concentrations greater than 10 μM.

== Total synthesis ==
Fumagillin and the related fumagillol (the hydrolysis product) have been a target in total synthesis, with several reported successful strategies, racemic, asymmetric, and formal.
