= PIGF =

Protein-coding gene in the species Homo sapiens

Identifiers
- Aliases: PIGF, phosphatidylinositol glycan anchor biosynthesis class F, OORS
- External IDs: OMIM: 600153; MGI: 99462; GeneCards: PIGF

Gene location (Human)
Chr.	Chromosome 2 (human)
Band	2p21	Start	46,580,937 bp
Band	2p21	End	46,617,055 bp

Gene location (Mouse)
Chr.	Chromosome 17 (mouse)
Band	17 E4|17 56.9 cM	Start	87,304,684 bp
Band	17 E4|17 56.9 cM	End	87,332,834 bp
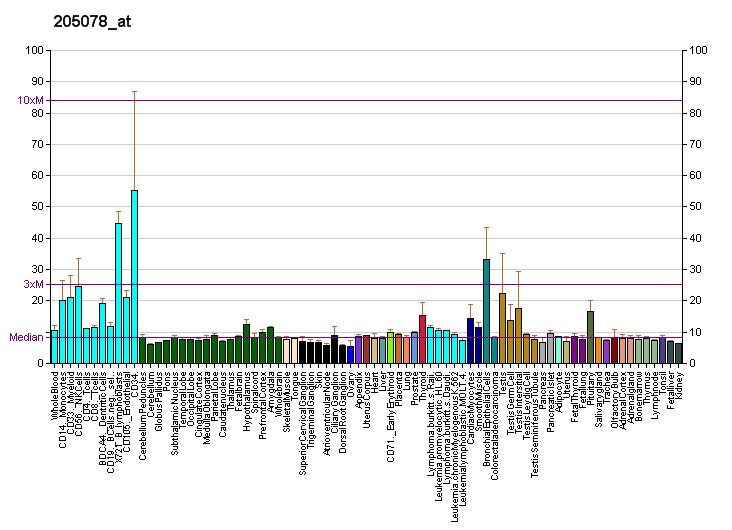

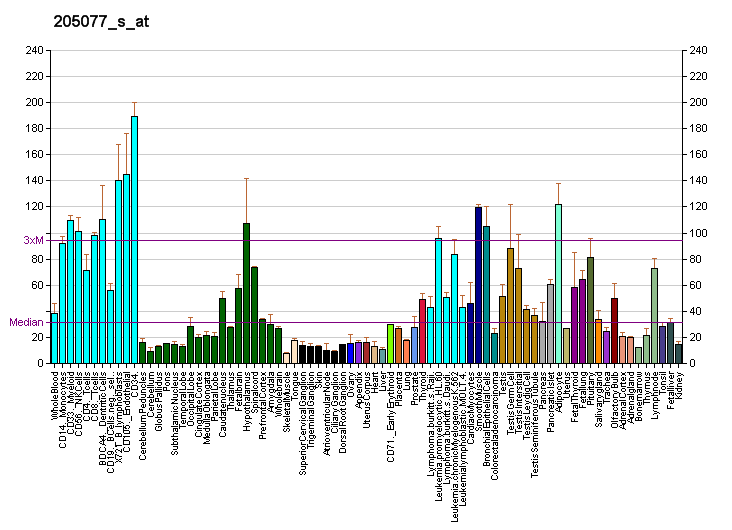
RNA expression pattern
Bgee	Human / Mouse (ortholog); Top expressed in: oocyte; islet of Langerhans; right adrenal gland; rectum; right adrenal cortex; left adrenal gland; left adrenal cortex; mucosa of transverse colon; monocyte; stromal cell of endometrium / Top expressed in: spermatid; secondary oocyte; zygote; spermatocyte; seminiferous tubule; primary oocyte; Paneth cell; epithelium of stomach; primitive streak; yolk sac; More reference expression data
BioGPS	More reference expression data
Gene ontology
Molecular function	ethanolaminephosphotransferase activity
Cellular component	integral component of membrane; endoplasmic reticulum membrane; endoplasmic reticulum; membrane
Biological process	GPI anchor biosynthetic process; preassembly of GPI anchor in ER membrane
Sources:Amigo / QuickGO
Orthologs
Databases	NCBI: entry; OMA: entry
Species	Human	Mouse
Entrez	5281	18701
Ensembl	ENSG00000151665	ENSMUSG00000024145
UniProt	Q07326	O09101
RefSeq (mRNA)	NM_002643; NM_173074	NM_008838
RefSeq (protein)	NP_002634; NP_775097	NP_032864
Location (UCSC)	Chr 2: 46.58 – 46.62 Mb	Chr 17: 87.3 – 87.33 Mb
PubMed search
- Wikidata
View/Edit Human	View/Edit Mouse

Phosphatidylinositol-glycan biosynthesis class F protein is a protein that in humans is encoded by the PIGF gene.

== Function ==
This gene encodes a protein that is involved in glycosylphosphatidylinositol (GPI)-anchor biosynthesis. The GPI-anchor is a glycolipid which contains three mannose molecules in its core backbone. The GPI-anchor is found on many blood cells and serves to anchor proteins to the cell surface. This protein and another GPI synthesis protein, PIGO, function in the transfer of ethanolaminephosphate (EtNP) to the third mannose in GPI. At least two alternatively spliced transcripts encoding distinct isoforms have been found for this gene.

== See also ==
- VEGF
