= Collagen, type IV, alpha 2 =

COL4A2
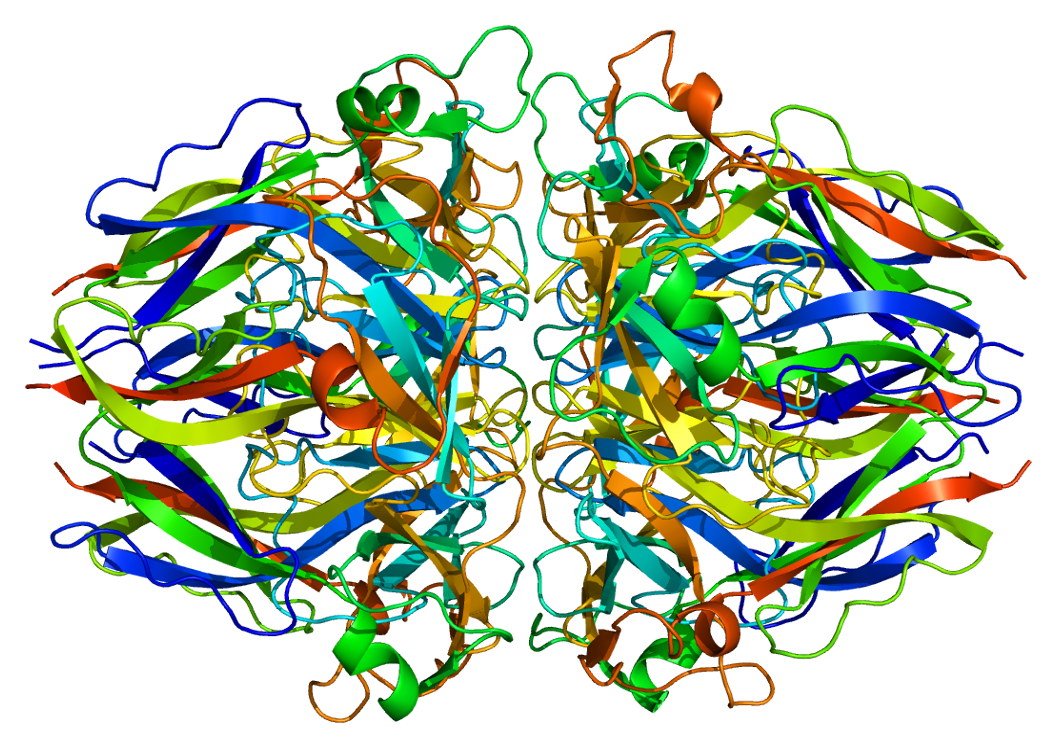

Identifiers
- Aliases: COL4A2, ICH, POREN2, collagen type IV alpha 2, collagen type IV alpha 2 chain, BSVD2
- External IDs: OMIM: 120090; MGI: 88455; GeneCards: COL4A2
Available structures
PDB	Ortholog search: PDBe RCSB
PDB	List of PDB id codes 1LI1

Gene location (Human)
Chr.	Chromosome 13 (human)
Band	13q34	Start	110,305,812 bp
Band	13q34	End	110,513,209 bp

Gene location (Mouse)
Chr.	Chromosome 8 (mouse)
Band	8 A1.1|8 5.62 cM	Start	11,362,805 bp
Band	8 A1.1|8 5.62 cM	End	11,499,287 bp
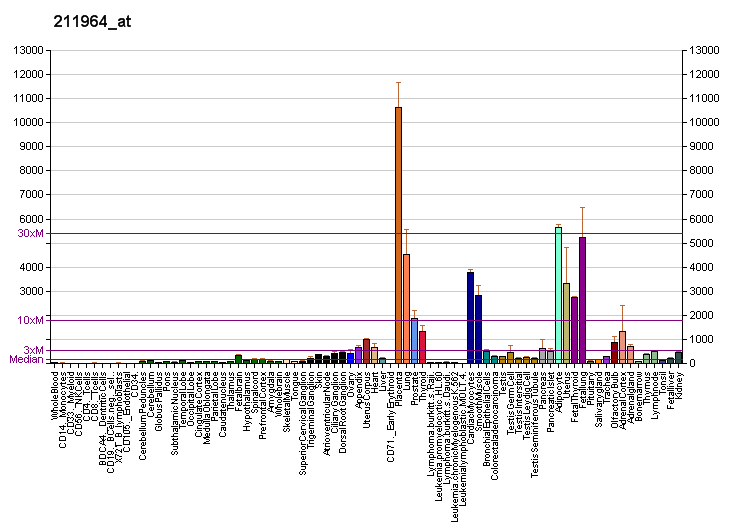

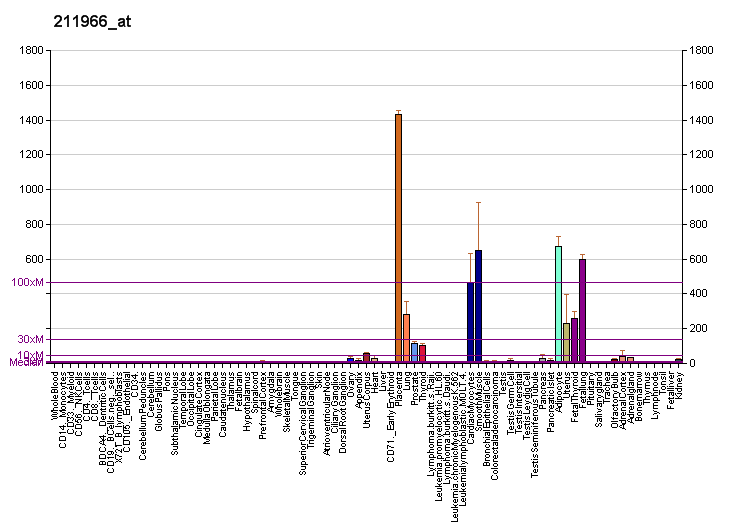
RNA expression pattern
Bgee	Human / Mouse (ortholog); Top expressed in: saphenous vein; decidua; pericardium; visceral pleura; stromal cell of endometrium; urethra; right coronary artery; ascending aorta; left coronary artery; Descending thoracic aorta / Top expressed in: epithelium of lens; left lung lobe; external carotid artery; internal carotid artery; lactiferous gland; stroma of bone marrow; ascending aorta; umbilical cord; decidua; aortic valve; More reference expression data
BioGPS	More reference expression data
Gene ontology
Molecular function	extracellular matrix structural constituent; protein binding; extracellular matrix structural constituent conferring tensile strength
Cellular component	extracellular matrix; extracellular region; basement membrane; collagen; collagen type IV trimer; endoplasmic reticulum lumen; extracellular exosome; extracellular space; collagen-containing extracellular matrix
Biological process	collagen catabolic process; negative regulation of angiogenesis; cellular response to transforming growth factor beta stimulus; extracellular matrix organization; endodermal cell differentiation; angiogenesis; transcription, DNA-templated; collagen-activated tyrosine kinase receptor signaling pathway; ageing; response to activity
Sources:Amigo / QuickGO
Orthologs
Databases	NCBI: entry; OMA: entry
Species	Human	Mouse
Entrez	1284	12827
Ensembl	ENSG00000134871	ENSMUSG00000031503
UniProt	P08572	P08122
RefSeq (mRNA)	NM_001846	NM_009932
RefSeq (protein)	NP_001837	NP_034062
Location (UCSC)	Chr 13: 110.31 – 110.51 Mb	Chr 8: 11.36 – 11.5 Mb
PubMed search
- Wikidata
View/Edit Human	View/Edit Mouse

Collagen alpha-2(IV) chain is a protein that in humans is encoded by the COL4A2 gene.

This gene encodes one of the six subunits of type IV collagen, the major structural component of basement membranes. The C-terminal portion of the protein, known as canstatin, is an inhibitor of angiogenesis and tumor growth. Like the other members of the type IV collagen gene family, this gene is organized in a head-to-head conformation with another type IV collagen gene so that each gene pair shares a common promoter.
