= Formylmethionine deformylase =

Class of enzymes

Identifiers
- EC no.: 3.5.1.31
- CAS no.: 9032-86-4

Databases
- BRENDA: enzyme data
- ExPASy: NiceZyme view
- KEGG: enzyme entry
- MetaCyc: metabolic pathway
- Rhea: reactions
- PDB structures: RCSB PDB PDBe PDBsum
- Gene Ontology: AmiGO / QuickGO
Search
- PMC: articles
- PubMed: articles
- NCBI: proteins

Formylmethionine deformylase (EC 3.5.1.31) is an enzyme that catalyzes the chemical reaction

N-formyl-L-methionine
H_{2}O
L-methionine
+
formic acid

The enzyme characterised from Euglena gracilis hydrolyses N-formyl-L-methionine to L-methionine and formic acid. The enzyme helps bacteria cope with oxidative stress.

This enzyme is a hydrolase, one acting on carbon-nitrogen bonds other than peptide bonds, specifically in linear amides. The systematic name of this enzyme class is N-formyl-L-methionine amidohydrolase.

== Structural studies ==
As of late 2007, 14 structures have been solved for this class of enzymes, with PDB accession codes PDB: 1BS4, PDB: 1BS5, PDB: 1BS6, PDB: 1BS7, PDB: 1BS8, PDB: 1BSZ, PDB: 1DEF, PDB: 1DFF, PDB: 1G27, PDB: 1G2A, PDB: 1ICJ, PDB: 1JYM, PDB: 1RL4, and PDB: 2DEF.
