= Angioprevention =

Angioprevention is the concept of preventing disease development or progression through the inhibition of angiogenesis, the process of forming blood vessels. The concept of angioprevention has been developed by Adriana Albini and co-workers who showed that several drugs and natural compounds for cancer chemo-prevention (or chemoprophylaxis) actually prevent tumor blood vessel formation. This concept has been furthered through the identification of many other "angiopreventive" compounds.

Neo-angiogenesis is crucial during tumor growth and progression since it provides oxygen and nutrients to the cancer cells and blood vessels constitute the major route of tumor cell dissemination leading to the formation of metastases. Inhibition of angiogenesis is expected to have major effects if started early during tumor development before metastatic cells have spread throughout the body. Dietary "angiopreventive" agents such as flavonoids or other polyphenols might therefore play an important role in cancer chemoprevention and retard or inhibit the growth and progression of cancers.
