= CNMD =

Protein-coding gene in humans

Identifiers
- Aliases: CNMD, BRICD3, CHM-I, CHM1, MYETS1, LECT1, leukocyte cell derived chemotaxin 1, chondromodulin
- External IDs: OMIM: 605147; MGI: 1341171; GeneCards: CNMD

Gene location (Human)
Chr.	Chromosome 13 (human)
Band	13q14.3	Start	52,703,264 bp
Band	13q14.3	End	52,739,820 bp

Gene location (Mouse)
Chr.	Chromosome 14 (mouse)
Band	14|14 D3	Start	79,875,130 bp
Band	14|14 D3	End	79,899,610 bp
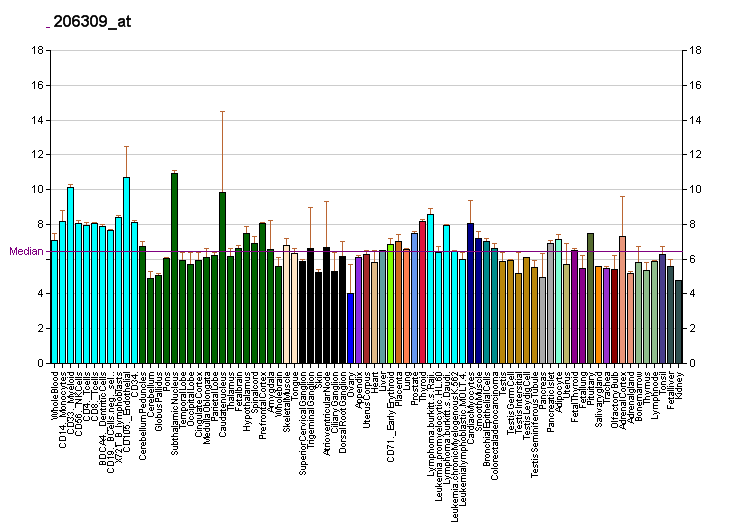
RNA expression pattern
Bgee	Human / Mouse (ortholog); Top expressed in: tibia; cartilage tissue; testicle; ventricular zone; gonad; ganglionic eminence; nucleus accumbens; caudate nucleus; retinal pigment epithelium; putamen / Top expressed in: vestibular membrane of cochlear duct; vestibular sensory epithelium; saccule; cochlea; human fetus; lumbar spinal ganglion; trachea; intercostal muscle; calvaria; utricle; More reference expression data
BioGPS	More reference expression data
Orthologs
Databases	NCBI: entry; OMA: entry
Species	Human	Mouse
Entrez	11061	16840
Ensembl	ENSG00000136110	ENSMUSG00000022025
UniProt	O75829	Q9Z1F6
RefSeq (mRNA)	NM_001011705; NM_007015	NM_010701; NM_001310655
RefSeq (protein)	NP_001011705; NP_008946	NP_001297584; NP_034831
Location (UCSC)	Chr 13: 52.7 – 52.74 Mb	Chr 14: 79.88 – 79.9 Mb
PubMed search
- Wikidata
View/Edit Human	View/Edit Mouse

Chondromodulin is a protein that in humans is encoded by the CNMD gene (previously LECT1).

== Function ==
This gene encodes a glycosylated transmembrane protein that is cleaved to form a mature, secreted protein. The N-terminus of the precursor protein shares characteristics with other surfactant proteins and is sometimes called chondrosurfactant protein, although no biological activity has yet been defined for it. The C-terminus of the precursor protein contains a 25 kDa mature protein called leukocyte cell-derived chemotaxin-1 or chondromodulin-1. The mature protein promotes chondrocyte growth and inhibits angiogenesis. This gene is expressed in the avascular zone of prehypertrophic cartilage, and its expression decreases during chondrocyte hypertrophy and vascular invasion. The mature protein likely plays a role in endochondral bone development by permitting cartilaginous anlagen to be vascularized and replaced by bone. It may also be involved in the broad control of tissue vascularization during development. Alternative splicing results in multiple transcript variants encoding different isoforms.

Chondromodulin-I, an antiangiogenic factor isolated from cartilage, is abundantly expressed in cardiac valves. Gene targeting of chondromodulin-I resulted in enhanced VEGF-A expression, angiogenesis, lipid deposition and calcification in the cardiac valves of aged mice.
