= Chemotherapy regimen =

Regimen commonly used in chemotherapy

A chemotherapy regimen is a regimen for chemotherapy, defining the drugs to be used, their dosage, the frequency and duration of treatments, and other considerations. In modern oncology, many regimens combine several chemotherapy drugs in combination chemotherapy. The majority of drugs used in cancer chemotherapy are cytostatic, many via cytotoxicity.

A fundamental philosophy of medical oncology, including combination chemotherapy, is that different drugs work through different mechanisms, and that the results of using multiple drugs will be synergistic to some extent. Because they have different dose-limiting adverse effects, they can be given together at full doses in chemotherapy regimens.

The first successful combination chemotherapy was MOPP, introduced in 1963 for lymphomas.

The term "induction regimen" refers to a chemotherapy regimen used for the initial treatment of a disease. A "maintenance regimen" refers to the ongoing use of chemotherapy to reduce the chances of a cancer recurring or to prevent an existing cancer from continuing to grow.

== Nomenclature ==
Chemotherapy regimens are often identified by acronyms, identifying the agents used in the drug combination. However, the letters used are not consistent across regimens, and in some cases - for example, "BEACOPP" - the same letter combination is used to represent two different treatments.

There is no widely accepted naming convention or standard for the nomenclature of chemotherapy regimens. For example, either generic or brand names may be used for acronyms. This page merely lists commonly used conventions.

== List of chemotherapy regimen acronyms ==
| Name | Components | Example of uses, and other notes |
|---|---|---|
| 7+3, also known as DA or DAC in case of daunorubicin, or IA or IAC in case of idarubicin use | 7 days of Ara-C (cytarabine) plus 3 days of an anthracycline antibiotic, either daunorubicin (DA or DAC variant) or idarubicin (IA or IAC variant) | Acute myelogenous leukemia, excluding acute promyelocytic leukemia |
| ABVD | doxorubicin (Adriamycin), bleomycin, vinblastine, dacarbazine | Hodgkin's lymphoma |
| AC | doxorubicin (Adriamycin), cyclophosphamide | breast cancer |
| BACOD | bleomycin, doxorubicin (Adriamycin), cyclophosphamide, vincristine (Oncovin), dexamethasone | Non-Hodgkin lymphomas |
| BEACOPP | bleomycin, etoposide, doxorubicin (Adriamycin), cyclophosphamide, vincristine (Oncovin), procarbazine, prednisone | Hodgkin's lymphoma |
| BEP | bleomycin, etoposide, platinum agent | testicular cancer, germ cell tumors |
| CA | cyclophosphamide, doxorubicin (Adriamycin) (same as AC) | breast cancer |
| CAF | cyclophosphamide, doxorubicin (Adriamycin), fluorouracil (5-FU) | breast cancer |
| CAPOX or XELOX | capecitabine and oxaliplatin | colorectal cancer |
| CAV | cyclophosphamide, doxorubicin (Adriamycin), vincristine | lung cancer |
| CBV | cyclophosphamide, BCNU (carmustine), VP-16 (etoposide) | lymphoma |
| CHOEP | cyclophosphamide, hydroxydaunorubicin (doxorubicin), etoposide, vincristine (Oncovin), prednisone | Non-Hodgkin lymphomas |
| CEPP | cyclophosphamide, etoposide, procarbazine, prednisone | Non-Hodgkin Lymphomas |
| ChlVPP/EVA | chlorambucil, vincristine (Oncovin), procarbazine, prednisone, etoposide, vinblastine, doxorubicin (Adriamycin) | Hodgkin's lymphoma |
| CHOP | cyclophosphamide, hydroxydaunorubicin (doxorubicin), vincristine (Oncovin), prednisone | non-Hodgkin lymphoma |
| CHOP-R or R-CHOP | CHOP + rituximab | B cell non-Hodgkin lymphoma |
| ClaPD | clarithromycin, pomalidomide, dexamethasone | multiple myeloma |
| CMF | cyclophosphamide, methotrexate, fluorouracil (5-FU) | breast cancer |
| CMV | cisplatin, methotrexate, vinblastine | transitional bladder carcinoma |
| COP or CVP | cyclophosphamide, Oncovin (vincristine), prednisone | non-Hodgkin lymphoma in patients with history of cardiovascular disease |
| COPP | cyclophosphamide, Oncovin (vincristine), procarbazine, prednisone | Hodgkin's lymphoma |
| CT or TC | docetaxel (Taxotere), cyclophosphamide | breast cancer |
| CTD | cyclophosphamide, thalidomide, dexamethasone | AL amyloidosis |
| CVAD and Hyper-CVAD | cyclophosphamide, vincristine, doxorubicin (Adriamycin), dexamethasone | aggressive non-Hodgkin lymphoma, lymphoblastic lymphoma, some forms of leukemia |
| CVE | carboplatin, vincristine, etoposide | retinoblastoma |
| CYBORD | cyclophosphamide, bortezomib, dexamethasone | multiple myeloma, AL amyloidosis |
| DA or DAC | daunorubicin x 3 days plus ara-C (cytarabine) x 7 days, a variant of 7+3 regimen | Acute myeloid leukemia, excluding acute promyelocytic leukemia |
| DAT | daunorubicin, cytarabine (ara-C), tioguanine | Acute myeloid leukemia |
| DCEP | dexamethasone, cyclophosphamide, etoposide, platinum agent | relapsed or refractory multiple myeloma |
| DHAP | dexamethasone (a steroid hormone), cytarabine (ara-C), platinum agent | Non-Hodgkin lymphomas |
| DHAP-R or R-DHAP | dexamethasone (a steroid hormone), cytarabine (ara-C), platinum agent plus rituximab | Non-Hodgkin lymphomas |
| DICE | dexamethasone, ifosfamide, cisplatin, etoposide (VP-16) | aggressive relapsed lymphomas, progressive neuroblastoma |
| DT-PACE | dexamethasone, thalidomide, platinum agent, doxorubicin (Adriamycin), cyclophosphamide, etoposide | multiple myeloma |
| EC | epirubicin, cyclophosphamide | breast cancer |
| ECF (MAGIC) | epirubicin, cisplatin, fluorouracil (5-FU) | gastric cancer and cancer of the esophagogastric junction (Siewert classification III) |
| EOX | epirubicin, oxaliplatin, capecitabine | esophageal Cancer, gastric Cancer |
| EP | etoposide, platinum agent | testicular cancer, germ cell tumors |
| EPOCH | etoposide, prednisone, vincristine (Oncovin), cyclophosphamide, and hydroxydaunorubicin | Non-Hodgkin lymphomas |
| EPOCH-R or R-EPOCH | etoposide, prednisone, vincristine (Oncovin), cyclophosphamide, and hydroxydaunorubicin plus rituximab | B cell Non-Hodgkin lymphomas |
| ESHAP | etoposide, methylprednisolone (a steroid hormone), cytarabine (ara-C), platinum agent | Non-Hodgkin lymphoma |
| ESHAP-R or R-ESHAP | etoposide, methylprednisolone (a steroid hormone), cytarabine (ara-C), platinum agent plus rituximab | Non-Hodgkin lymphoma |
| FAM | fluorouracil, doxorubicin (Adriamycin), mitomycin | gastric cancer |
| FAMTX | fluorouracil, doxorubicin (Adriamycin), methotrexate | gastric cancer |
| FCM or FMC | fludarabine, cyclophosphamide, mitoxantrone | B cell non-Hodgkin lymphoma |
| FCM-R or R-FCM or R-FMC or FMC-R | fludarabine, cyclophosphamide, mitoxantrone plus rituximab | B cell non-Hodgkin lymphoma |
| FCR | fludarabine, cyclophosphamide, rituximab | B cell non-Hodgkin lymphoma |
| FM | fludarabine, mitoxantrone | B cell non-Hodgkin lymphoma |
| FM-R or R-FM or RFM or FMR | fludarabine, mitoxantrone, and rituximab | B cell non-Hodgkin lymphoma |
| FEC | fluorouracil (5-FU), epirubicin, cyclophosphamide | breast cancer |
| FEC-T | fluorouracil (5-FU), epirubicin, cyclophosphamide together, followed by docetaxel (Taxotere) | breast cancer |
| FL (also known as Mayo) | fluorouracil (5-FU), leucovorin (folinic acid) | colorectal cancer |
| FLAG | fludarabine, cytarabine, G-CSF | relapsed or refractory acute myelogenous leukemia |
| FLAG-Ida or FLAG-IDA or IDA-FLAG or Ida-FLAG | fludarabine, cytarabine, idarubicin, G-CSF | relapsed or refractory acute myelogenous leukemia |
| FLAG-Mito or FLAG-MITO or Mito-FLAG or MITO-FLAG or FLANG | mitoxantrone, fludarabine, cytarabine, G-CSF | relapsed or refractory acute myelogenous leukemia |
| FLAMSA | fludarabine, cytarabine, amsacrine | myelodysplastic syndrome, acute myeloid leukemia |
| FLAMSA-BU or FLAMSA-Bu | fludarabine, cytarabine, amsacrine, busulfan | myelodysplastic syndrome, acute myeloid leukemia |
| FLAMSA-MEL or FLAMSA-Mel | fludarabine, cytarabine, amsacrine, melphalan | myelodysplastic syndrome, acute myeloid leukemia |
| FLOT | fluorouracil (5-FU), leucovorin (folinic acid), oxaliplatin, docetaxel | esophageal cancer, gastric cancer |
| FOLFIRI | fluorouracil (5-FU), leucovorin (folinic acid), irinotecan | colorectal cancer |
| FOLFIRINOX | fluorouracil (5-FU), leucovorin (folinic acid), irinotecan, oxaliplatin | pancreatic cancer |
| FOLFOX | fluorouracil (5-FU), leucovorin (folinic acid), oxaliplatin | colorectal cancer |
| GC | gemcitabine, cisplatin gemcitabine, dexamethasone, and cisplatin | bladder cancer |
| GDP | gemcitabine, dexamethasone, cisplatin | Non-Hodgkin lymphomas and Hodgkin lymphoma |
| GemOx or GEMOX | gemcitabine, oxaliplatin | Non-Hodgkin lymphomas |
| GVD | gemcitabine, vinorelbine, pegylated liposomal doxorubicin | Hodgkin lymphoma |
| GemOx-R or GEMOX-R or R-GemOx or R-GEMOX | gemcitabine, oxaliplatin, rituximab | Non-Hodgkin lymphomas |
| IA or IAC | idarubicin x 3 days plus Ara-C (cytarabine) x 7 days, a variant of classical 7+3 regimen | Acute myelogenous leukemia, excluding acute promyelocytic leukemia |
| ICE | ifosfamide, carboplatin, etoposide (VP-16) | aggressive lymphomas, progressive neuroblastoma |
| ICE-R or R-ICE or RICE | ICE + rituximab | high-risk progressive or recurrent lymphomas |
| IFL | irinotecan, leucovorin (folinic acid), fluorouracil | colorectal cancer |
| IVA | ifosfamide, vincristine, actinomycin D | rhabdomyosarcoma |
| MAP or MAPIE | Doxorubicin (Adriamycin), Cisplatin, Methotrexate, Ifosfamide (Ifex), Etoposide (Vepesid) | Bone cancer, Osteosarcoma |
| m-BACOD | methotrexate, bleomycin, doxorubicin (Adriamycin), cyclophosphamide, vincristine (Oncovin), dexamethasone | non-Hodgkin lymphoma |
| MACOP-B | methotrexate with leucovorin (folinic acid) rescue, doxorubicin (Adriamycin), cyclophosphamide, vincristine (Oncovin), prednisone, bleomycin | non-Hodgkin lymphoma |
| MAID | mesna, doxorubicin, ifosfamide, dacarbazine | soft-tissue sarcoma |
| MINE | mesna, ifosfamide, novantrone, etoposide | Non-Hodgkin lymphomas and Hodgkin lymphoma in relapse or refractory cases |
| MINE-R or R-MINE | mesna, ifosfamide, novantrone, etoposide plus rituximab | Non-Hodgkin lymphomas and Hodgkin lymphoma in relapse or refractory cases |
| MMM | mitomycin, methotrexate, mitoxantrone | breast cancer |
| MOPP | mechlorethamine, vincristine (Oncovin), procarbazine, prednisone | Hodgkin's lymphoma |
| MVAC | methotrexate, vinblastine, doxorubicin (Adriamycin), cisplatin | advanced bladder cancer |
| MVP | mitomycin, vindesine, cisplatin | lung cancer and mesothelioma |
| NP | cisplatin, vinorelbine | non-small cell lung carcinoma |
| PACE | platinum agent, doxorubicin (Adriamycin), cyclophosphamide, etoposide | |
| PCV | Procarbazine, CCNU (lomustine), vincristine | brain tumors |
| PEB | cisplatin, etoposide, bleomycin | non-seminomatous germ cell tumors |
| PEI | cisplatin, etoposide, ifosfamide | small-cell lung carcinoma |
| platin + taxane | cisplatin/carboplatin, paclitaxel/docetaxel | ovarian cancer |
| POMP | 6-mercaptopurine (Purinethol), vincristine (Oncovin), methotrexate, and prednisone | acute adult leukemia |
| ProMACE-MOPP | methotrexate, doxorubicin (Adriamycin), cyclophosphamide, etoposide + MOPP | non-Hodgkin lymphoma |
| ProMACE-CytaBOM | prednisone, doxorubicin (Adriamycin), cyclophosphamide, etoposide, cytarabine, bleomycin, vincristine (Oncovin), methotrexate, leucovorin | non-Hodgkin lymphoma |
| RdC | lenalidomide (Revlimid), dexamethasone, cyclophosphamide | AL amyloidosis |
| R-Benda | rituximab + bendamustine | follicular lymphoma and MALT lymphoma |
| R-DHAP or DHAP-R | rituximab + DHAP; that is, rituximab, dexamethasone (a steroid hormone), cytarabine (ara-C), platinum agent | relapsed non-Hodgkin's lymphoma and Hodgkin's lymphoma |
| R-FCM or FCM-R | rituximab + FCM; that is, rituximab, fludarabine, cyclophosphamide, mitoxantrone | B cell non-Hodgkin lymphoma |
| R-ICE or ICE-R or RICE | rituximab + ICE; that is, rituximab, ifosfamide, carboplatin, etoposide | high-risk progressive or recurrent lymphomas |
| RVD | lenalidomide (Revlimid), bortezomib, dexamethasone | |
| Stanford V | doxorubicin (Adriamycin), mechlorethamine, bleomycin, vinblastine, vincristine, etoposide, prednisone | Hodgkin lymphoma |
| TAC or ACT | docetaxel (Taxotere) or paclitaxel (Taxol), doxorubicin (Adriamycin), cyclophosphamide | breast cancer ("TAC" can also refer to tetracaine-adrenaline-cocaine, used as local anesthetic) |
| TAD | tioguanine, cytarabine (ara-C), daunorubicin | acute myeloid leukemia |
| TC or CT | docetaxel (Taxotere), cyclophosphamide | breast cancer |
| TCH | docetaxel (Taxotere), carboplatin, trastuzumab (Herceptin) | breast cancer with positive HER2/neu receptor |
| TCHP | docetaxel (Taxotere), carboplatin, trastuzumab (Herceptin), pertuzumab (Perjeta) | breast cancer with positive HER2/neu receptor |
| Thal/Dex | thalidomide, dexamethasone | multiple myeloma |
| TIP | paclitaxel (Taxol), ifosfamide, platinum agent cisplatin (Platinol) | testicular cancer, germ cell tumors in salvage therapy |
| EE-4A | vincristine, actinomycin | Wilms' tumor |
| DD-4A | vincristine, actinomycin, doxorubicin (Adriamycin) | Wilms' tumor |
| VABCD | vinblastine, doxorubicin (Adriamycin), bleomycin, lomustine (CeeNU), dacarbazine | MOPP refractory Hodgkin's Lymphoma |
| VAC | vincristine, actinomycin, cyclophosphamide | rhabdomyosarcoma |
| VAD | vincristine, doxorubicin (Adriamycin), dexamethasone | multiple myeloma |
| VAMP | one of 3 combinations of vincristine and others | Hodgkin's lymphoma, leukemia, multiple myeloma |
| Regimen I | vincristine, doxorubicin (Adriamycin), etoposide, cyclophosphamide | Wilms' tumor |
| VAPEC-B | vincristine, doxorubicin (Adriamycin), prednisone, etoposide, cyclophosphamide, bleomycin | Hodgkin's lymphoma |
| VDC-IE | vincristine, doxorubicin, cyclophosphamide, ifosfamide, etoposide | Ewing's sarcoma |
| VD-PACE | bortezomib, dexamethasone plus platinum agent, doxorubicin (Adriamycin), cyclophosphamide, etoposide | multiple myeloma |
| VIFUP | vinorelbine, cisplatin, fluorouracil | locally advanced/metastatic breast cancer |
| VIP | vinblastine, ifosfamide, platinum agent, (etoposide (VP-16) may substitute for vinblastine, making a regimen sometimes referred to as VIP-16) | testicular cancer, germ cell tumors |
| VTD-PACE | bortezomib (Velcade), thalidomide, dexamethasone plus platinum agent, doxorubicin (Adriamycin), cyclophosphamide, etoposide | multiple myeloma |
| V-DCEP | bortezomib (Velcade), dexamethasone, cyclophosphamide, etoposide, platinum agent | relapsed or refractory multiple myeloma |

== See also ==
- National Comprehensive Cancer Network Treatment Guidelines
- Breast cancer chemotherapy
- High-dose chemotherapy
- Sequential high-dose chemotherapy
