= ICE (chemotherapy) =

ICE in the context of chemotherapy is an acronym for one of the chemotherapy regimens, used in salvage treatment of relapsed or refractory non-Hodgkin lymphoma and Hodgkin lymphoma.

In case of CD20-positive B cell lymphoid malignancies the ICE regimen is often combined today with rituximab. This regimen is then called ICE-R or R-ICE or RICE.

[R]-ICE regimen consists of:

1. Rituximab - an anti-CD20 monoclonal antibody, which is able to kill both normal and malignant CD20-bearing B cells;
2. Ifosfamide - an alkylating antineoplastic agent of the oxazafosforine group;
3. Carboplatin - a platinum-based antineoplastic drug, also an alkylating antineoplastic agent;
4. Etoposide - a topoisomerase inhibitor.

== Dosing regimen ==
Drug	Dose	Mode	Days
Rituximab	375 mg/m^{2}	IV infusion	Day 1
Ifosfamide	5000 mg/m^{2}	IV continuous infusion over 24 hours	Day 2
Mesna for haemorrhagic cystitis prophylaxis with ifosfamide	5000 mg/m^{2}	IV continuous infusion over 24 hours	Day 2
Carboplatin	Optimized to get AUC = 5 (max. 800 mg)	IV infusion	Day 2
Etoposide	100 mg/m^{2}	IV infusion over 1 hour	Days 1–3
Filgrastim to shorten the period of neutropenia	5 μg/kg	S.C.	Days 5–12

Cycles are repeated every 14 days for 3 cycles, then high-dose chemotherapy with autologous stem-cell transplantation follows (if the patient is considered eligible for HDCT and ASCT).
