= MINE (chemotherapy) =

Medical treatment for lymphoma

MINE in the context of chemotherapy is an acronym for one of the chemotherapy regimens used for treatment of relapsed or refractory aggressive non-Hodgkin lymphoma and Hodgkin lymphoma.

Today this regimen is often combined with monoclonal antibody rituximab. In this case the regimen is called R-MINE or MINE-R.

The [R]-MINE regimen consists of:

1. Rituximab - anti-CD20 monoclonal antibody that can kill both normal CD20-expressing B cells and malignant ones;
2. Mesna to prevent the development of hemorrhagic cystitis which may otherwise result from ifosfamide administration;
3. Ifosfamide - an alkylating antineoplastic agent from oxazafosforine group;
4. Mitoxantrone - a synthetic anthracycline analogue (anthraquinone) that is able to intercalate DNA and thus prevent cell division (mitosis);
5. Etoposide - a topoisomerase inhibitor.

== Dosing regimen ==
Drug	Dose	Mode	Days
Rituximab	375 mg/m^{2}	IV infusion	Day 1
Mesna	1330 mg/m^{2}	IV infusion over 1h together with ifosfamide, plus 500 mg PO 4h after ifosfamide	Days 1-3
Ifosfamide	1330 mg/m^{2}	IV infusion over 1h	Days 1-3
Mitoxantrone	8 mg/m^{2}	IV infusion	Day 1
Etoposide	65 mg/m^{2}	IV infusion over 1h	Days 1-3
