= FLAG (chemotherapy) =

- Specialty: Oncology

FLAG is a chemotherapy regimen used for relapsed and refractory acute myeloid leukemia (AML). The acronym incorporates the three primary ingredients of the regimen:

1. Fludarabine: an antimetabolite that, while not active toward AML, increases formation of an active cytarabine metabolite, ara-CTP, in AML cells;
2. Arabinofuranosyl cytidine (or ara-C): an antimetabolite that has been proven to be the most active toward AML among various cytotoxic drugs in single-drug trials; and
3. Granulocyte colony-stimulating factor (G-CSF): a glycoprotein that shortens the duration and severity of neutropenia.

FLAG and FLAG-based regimens can also be used in cases of concomitant AML and either acute lymphoblastic leukemia (ALL) or lymphoma. Because fludarabine is highly active in lymphoid malignancies, these regimens can further be used when patients have biphenotypic AML, in which cells display properties of both myeloid and lymphoid cells.

== Intensified FLAG regimens ==
There are several intensified versions of the FLAG regimen in which a third chemotherapeutic agent is added.

=== FLAG-IDA ===
In the FLAG-IDA regimen (also called FLAG-Ida, IDA-FLAG, or Ida-FLAG), idarubicin—an anthracycline antibiotic that is able to intercalate DNA and prevent cell division (mitosis)—is added to the standard FLAG regimen.

=== MITO-FLAG ===
MITO-FLAG (also called Mito-FLAG, FLAG-MITO, or FLAG-Mito) adds mitoxantrone to the standard regimen. Mitoxantrone is a synthetic anthracycline analogue (an anthracenedione) that, like idarubicin, can intercalate DNA and prevent cell division.

=== FLAMSA ===
FLAMSA adds amsacrine ("AMSA") to the standard FLAG regimen. (G-CSF is still included, even though the "G" is taken out of the acronym.) Amsacrine is an alkylating antineoplastic agent that is highly active toward AML, unlike more conventional alkylators like cyclophosphamide.

The FLAMSA protocol is most often used as an induction part of a reduced-intensity conditioning regimen for patients eligible to undergo an allogeneic stem cell transplant. In this setting, it is often combined with other agents, such as:

- Cyclophosphamide (FLAMSA-CYC), and/or
- Busulfan or treosulfan (FLAMSA-BU or FLAMSA-TREO), and/or
- Melphalan (FLAMSA-MEL), and/or
- Total body irradiation, given shortly after the end of FLAMSA to prepare the patient for transplant.

== Dosing ==
=== Standard FLAG ===
Drug	Dose	Mode	Days
(FL)udarabine	30 mg/m^{2} a day	IV infusion over 30 min, every 12 hours in 2 divided doses	Days 1–5
(A)ra-C	2000 mg/m^{2}	IV infusion over 4 hours, every 12 hours in 2 divided doses, starting 4 hours after the end of fludarabine infusion	Days 1–5
(G)-CSF	5 μg/kg	SC	From day 6 until neutrophil recovery

=== FLAG-IDA ===
Drug	Dose	Mode	Days
(FL)udarabine	30 mg/m^{2} a day	IV infusion over 30 min, every 12 hours in 2 divided doses	Days 1–5
(A)ra-C	2000 mg/m^{2} a day	IV infusion over 4 hours, every 12 hours in 2 divided doses, starting 4 hours after the end of fludarabine infusion	Days 1–5
(IDA)rubicin	10 mg/m^{2}	IV bolus	Days 1–3
(G)-CSF	5 μg/kg	SC	From day 6 until neutrophil recovery

=== Mito-FLAG ===
Drug	Dose	Mode	Days
(FL)udarabine	30 mg/m^{2}	IV infusion over 30 min, every 12 hours in 2 divided doses	Days 1–5
(A)ra-C	2000 mg/m^{2}	IV infusion over 3 hours, every 12 hours in 2 divided doses, starting 4 hours after the end of fludarabine infusion	Days 1–5
(Mito)xantrone	7 mg/m^{2}	IV infusion	Days 1, 3 and 5
(G)-CSF	5 μg/kg	SC	From day 6 until neutrophil recovery

=== FLAMSA ===
Drug	Dose	Mode	Days
(FL)udarabine	30 mg/m^{2}	IV infusion over 30 min, every 12 hours in 2 divided doses	Days 1–4
(A)ra-C	2000 mg/m^{2}	IV infusion over 4 hours, every 12 hours in 2 divided doses, starting 4 hours after the end of fludarabine infusion	Days 1–4
(AMSA)crine	100 mg/m^{2}	IV infusion	Days 1–4
Filgrastim	5 μg/kg	SC	From transplant day (or Day 5 if FLAMSA is not a part of conditioning) until neutrophil recovery
