= FCM (chemotherapy) =

Chemotherapy regimen

FCM, or FMC in the context of chemotherapy is an acronym for a chemotherapy regimen that is used in the treatment of indolent B cell non-Hodgkin lymphomas. In combination with Rituximab, this regimen is called R-FCM or R-FMC, or FCM-R, FMC-R.

The [R]-FCM regimen contains

1. Rituximab - anti-CD20 monoclonal antibody that can kill both normal and malignant CD20-bearing B cells;
2. Fludarabine - an antimetabolite;
3. Cyclophosphamide - an alkylating antineoplastic agent from the oxazafosforine group;
4. Mitoxantrone - a synthetic anthracycline analogue (anthraquinone) that can intercalate DNA, thereby preventing cell division.

== Clinical use ==
The addition of monoclonal antibodies like rituximab to chemotherapy regimens has increased treatment outcomes for patients with indolent B cell non-Hodgkin lymphomas, including chronic lymphocytic leukemia. R-FCM regimens were recommended prior to the discovery of targeted therapies, such as Bruton tyrosine kinase inhibitors and Bcl-2 inhibitors, but trials have shown the superiority of targeted therapies in terms of survival and side effect profiles. R-FCM can be considered in resource-limited settings without access to targeted therapies. R-FCM should not be considered in patients with a 17p deletion, a TP53 mutations, and in patients with unmutated immunoglobulin heavy chain variable (IGHV), as R-FCM is less effective than targeted therapies.

== Dosing regimen ==
The recommended dosing schedule for R-FCM is based on patient weight and general fitness. Each cycle lasts 28 days for a maximum of 6 cycles.

Drug	Dose	Mode	Days
Rituximab	375 mg/m^{2}	IV infusion	Day 0
Fludarabine	25 mg/m^{2}	IV infusion over 30 min	Days 1-3
Cyclophosphamide	250 mg/m^{2}	IV infusion over 4 hours	Days 1-3
Mitoxantrone	8 mg/m^{2}	IV infusion over 30 min	Day 1
