= GemOx =

GemOx or GEMOX is an acronym for one of the chemotherapy regimens used in the treatment of relapsed or primary refractory non-Hodgkin lymphoma and Hodgkin lymphoma.

When combined with Rituximab it is called R-GemOx, R-GEMOX or GemOx-R, GEMOX-R.

The [R]-GemOx regimen consists of:

1. Rituximab - anti-CD20 monoclonal antibody that has the ability to kill both normal and malignant B cells;
2. Gemcitabine - an antimetabolite;
3. Oxaliplatin - a platinum-based alkylating antineoplastic agent.

== Dosing regimen ==
Drug	Dose	Mode	Days
Rituximab	375 mg/m^{2}	IV infusion	Day 1
Gemcitabine	1000 mg/m^{2}	IV infusion in 500 ml normal saline with the speed of 10 mg/m^{2}/min	Day 2
Oxaliplatin	100 mg/m^{2}	IV infusion over 2hrs	Day 2
