= List of antileukemic drugs =

List of drugs given to treat leukemia

Antileukemic drugs, anticancer drugs that are used to treat one or more types of leukemia, include:

- 6-Mercaptopurine
- 6-Thioguanine
- Arsenic trioxide
- Asparaginase
- Cladribine
- Clofarabine
- Cyclophosphamide
- Cytosine arabinoside
- Dasatinib
- Daunorubicin
- Decitabine
- Etoposide
- Fludarabine
- Gemtuzumab ozogamicin
- Idarubicin
- Imatinib mesylate
- Interferon-α
- Interleukin-2
- Melphalan
- Methotrexate
- Mitoxantrone
- Nelarabine
- Nilotinib
- Oblimersen
- Pegaspargase
- Pentostatin
- Ponatinib
- Prednisone
- Rituximab
- Tretinoin
- Vincristine
