= Durvalumab =

Pharmaceutical drug

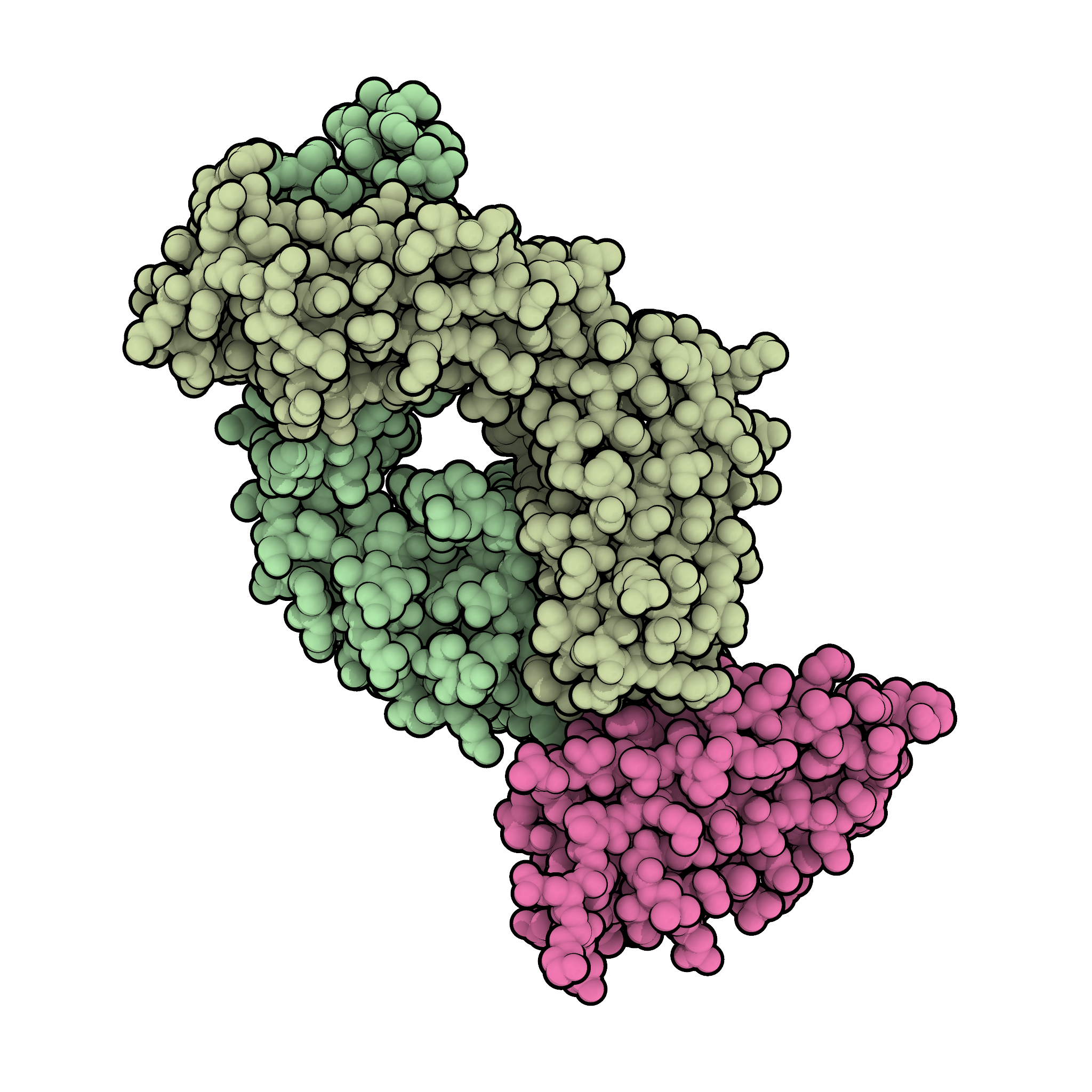
- Antigen-binding fragment of durvalumab (pale green) in complex with PD-L1 (pink). PDB: 5X8M.

Monoclonal antibody
- Type: Whole antibody
- Source: Human
- Target: CD274

Clinical data
- Trade names: Imfinzi
- Other names: MEDI4736, MEDI-4736
- AHFS/Drugs.com: Monograph
- MedlinePlus: a617030
- License data: US DailyMed: Durvalumab
- Pregnancy category: AU: D
- Routes of administration: Intravenous
- ATC code: L01FF03 (WHO)

Legal status
- Legal status: AU: S4 (Prescription only); CA: ℞-only / Schedule D; UK: POM (Prescription only); US: ℞-only; EU: Rx-only

Identifiers
- CAS Number: 1428935-60-7
- PubChem CID: 249565666
- IUPHAR/BPS: 7985
- DrugBank: DB11714
- ChemSpider: none
- UNII: 28X28X9OKV
- KEGG: D10808

Chemical and physical data
- Formula: C_{6502}H_{10018}N_{1742}O_{2024}S_{42}
- Molar mass: 146322.36 g·mol^{−1}

Durvalumab, sold under the brand name Imfinzi, is an anti-cancer medication used for treatment of various types of cancer. It was developed by Medimmune/AstraZeneca. It is a human immunoglobulin G1 kappa (IgG1κ) monoclonal antibody that binds to programmed cell death ligand 1 (PD-L1) on cancer cells and blocks interactions with PD-1 and CD80 (B7.1) on T cells.

Durvalumab is an immune checkpoint inhibitor drug. It was approved in for medical use in the United States in May 2017, and in the European Union in September 2018.

== Medical uses ==
The US Food and Drug Administration (FDA) approved durvalumab for certain types of bladder, lung, and biliary tract cancer:

- Adults with locally advanced or metastatic urothelial carcinoma who either have disease progression during or following platinum-containing chemotherapy or have disease progression within twelve months of neoadjuvant or adjuvant treatment with platinum-containing chemotherapy.
- Adults with unresectable, Stage III non-small cell lung cancer whose disease has not progressed following concurrent platinum-based chemotherapy and radiation therapy.
- In combination with etoposide and either carboplatin or cisplatin, as first-line treatment for adults with extensive-stage small cell lung cancer.
- In combination with gemcitabine and cisplatin for adults with locally advanced or metastatic biliary tract cancer (BTC).

In June 2024, the US FDA approved durvalumab with carboplatin plus paclitaxel, followed by single-agent durvalumab, for adults with primary advanced or recurrent endometrial cancer that is mismatch repair deficient.

In August 2024, the FDA approved durvalumab with platinum-containing chemotherapy as neoadjuvant treatment, followed by single-agent durvalumab as adjuvant treatment after surgery for adults with resectable (tumors ≥ 4 cm and/or node positive) non-small cell lung cancer (NSCLC) and no known epidermal growth factor receptor (EGFR) mutations or anaplastic lymphoma kinase (ALK) rearrangements. Efficacy was evaluated in AEGEAN (NCT03800134), a randomized, double-blind, placebo-controlled multicenter trial in 802 participants with previously untreated and resectable squamous or non-squamous NSCLC (stage IIA to select stage IIIB [AJCC, 8th edition]). Participants were randomized (1:1) to either durvalumab or placebo, with platinum-based chemotherapy, every 3 weeks for up to 4 cycles (neoadjuvant treatment) followed by either continued single-agent durvalumab or placebo, every 4 weeks for up to 12 cycles (adjuvant treatment).

In December 2024, the FDA expanded the indication of durvalumab to include adults with limited-stage small cell lung cancer whose disease has not progressed following concurrent platinum-based chemotherapy and radiation therapy. The efficacy was evaluated in ADRIATIC (NCT03703297), a randomized, double-blind, placebo-controlled trial in 730 participants with LS-SCLC whose disease had not progressed following concurrent platinum-based chemotherapy and radiation therapy. Participants were randomized 1:1:1 to receive durvalumab as a single agent, durvalumab in combination with tremelimumab, or placebo.

In March 2025, the FDA approved durvalumab with gemcitabine and cisplatin as neoadjuvant treatment, followed by single agent durvalumab as adjuvant treatment following radical cystectomy, for adults with muscle invasive bladder cancer. The efficacy was evaluated in NIAGARA (NCT03732677), a randomized, open-label, multicenter, phase III trial enrolling 1,063 participants who were candidates for radical cystectomy and had not received prior systemic therapy for bladder cancer. Participants were randomized (1:1) to receive neoadjuvant durvalumab with chemotherapy followed by adjuvant durvalumab after surgery or neoadjuvant chemotherapy followed by surgery alone.

In November 2025, the US FDA approved durvalumab with fluorouracil, leucovorin, oxaliplatin, and docetaxel (FLOT chemotherapy) as neoadjuvant and adjuvant treatment, followed by single agent durvalumab, for adults with resectable gastric or gastroesophageal junction adenocarcinoma.

In May 2026, the US FDA approved durvalumab in combination with Bacillus Calmette-Guerin (BCG) for the treatment of adults with BCG-naïve, high-risk non-muscle invasive bladder cancer. Efficacy was evaluated in the POTOMAC study (NCT03528694), a randomized, open-label, multicenter trial that enrolled 1,018 participants with high-risk non-muscle invasive bladder cancer following transurethral resection of bladder tumor. High-risk non-muscle invasive bladder cancer was defined as having one of the following: T1 tumor, Grade 3/high-grade tumor, carcinoma in situ (CIS), or multiple, recurrent, and large tumors. Participants were randomized (1:1:1) to receive either durvalumab every four weeks for 13 cycles plus BCG induction and maintenance, BCG induction and maintenance, or an additional investigational combination regimen.

== History ==
=== Clinical trials ===
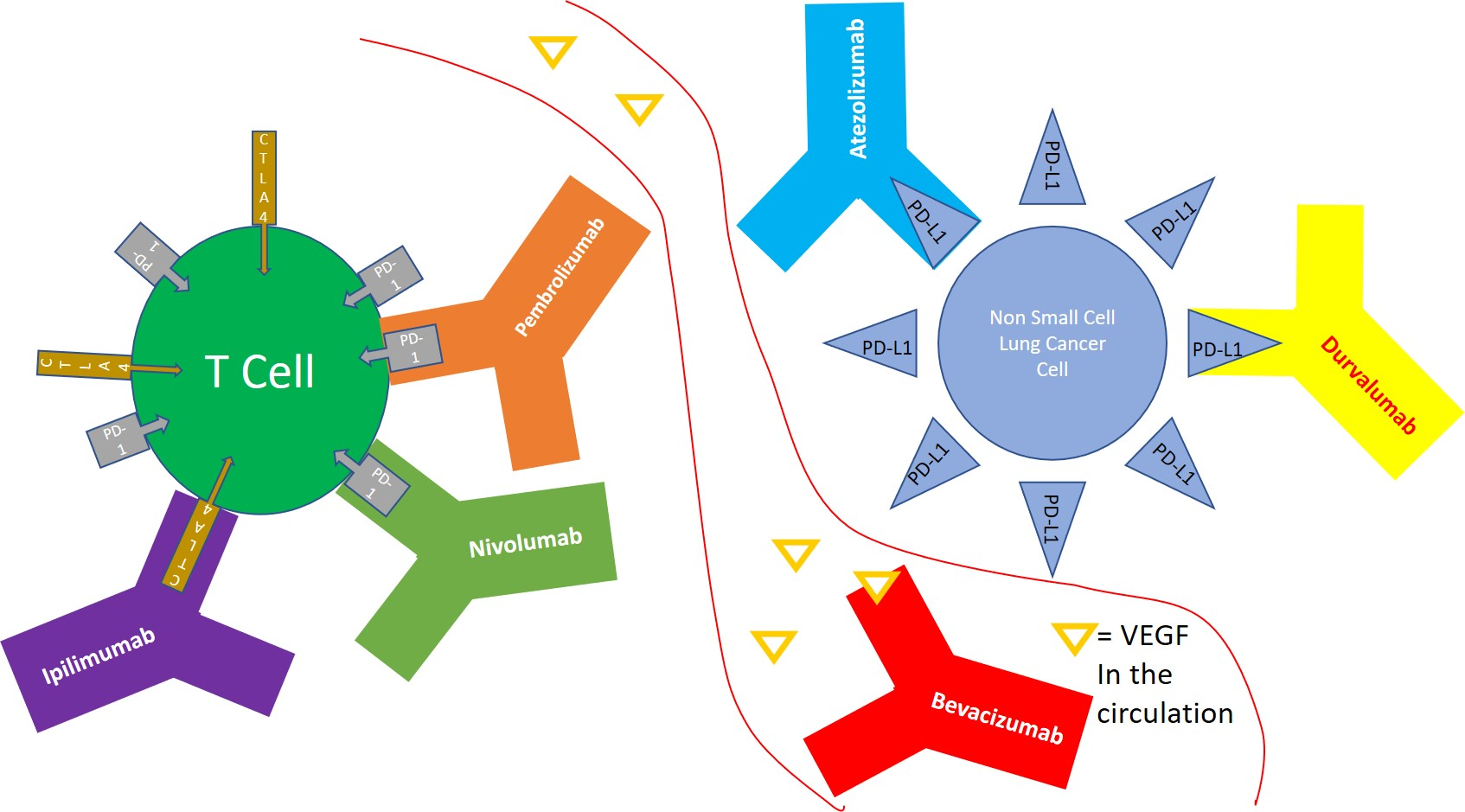
Immunotherapy: mechanism of action for Durvalumab, Pembrolizumab, Ipilimumab, Atezolizumab.

A phase Ib clinical trial of durvalumab and tremelimumab showed some activity in non-small cell lung cancer (NSCLC) Phase I data in advanced metastatic urothelial bladder (Study 1108) has led to FDA breakthrough therapy designation. Early results of a phase I trial combining durvalumab and gefitinib in participants with lung cancer "showed promise". A phase I clinical trial was conducted using durvalumab with a TLR 7/8 agonist (MEDI 9197) for solid tumors. A phase 1b/2a trial was conducted combining durvalumab with an HPV DNA vaccine (MEDI 0457) in participants with HPV-associated recurrent/metastatic head and neck cancer.

==== MYSTIC ====
In July 2017, AstraZeneca announced that a phase III trial of durvalumab with tremelimumab as a first-line treatment of non-small cell lung cancer failed to meet its primary endpoint of progression-free survival.

==== PACIFIC ====
In November 2017, the double-blinded phase III AstraZeneca PACIFIC clinical trial demonstrated the efficacy of durvalumab in the treatment of stage III non-small cell lung cancer. 709 participants with stage III NSCLC who did not have disease progression after two or more cycles of a platinum-based chemotherapy were randomly assigned to receive durvalumab or a placebo as consolidation therapy for their lung cancer. Durvalumab increased the median progression-free survival from 5.6 months (placebo) to 16.8 months (durvalumab); the 12 month progression-free survival rate was increased from 35.3% (placebo) to 55.9% (durvalumab), and the 18 month progression-free survival rate was increased from 27.0% (placebo) to 44.2% (durvalumab). The median time to death or distant metastases was also increased from 14.6 months (placebo) to 23.2 months (durvalumab). Extreme side effects were also increased from 26.1% of participants (placebo) to 29.9% of participants (durvalumab).

==== CASPIAN ====
In March 2021, the open-label, sponsor-blind (AstraZeneca), randomized, controlled phase III trial at 209 cancer treatment centers in 23 countries worldwide (CASPIAN) demonstrated the efficacy of durvalumab in combination with platinum-based chemotherapy in the treatment of small cell lung cancer.

Between March 2017, and May 2018, 972 participants were screened and 805 were randomly assigned (268 to durvalumab plus tremelimumab plus platinum–etoposide, 268 to durvalumab plus platinum–etoposide, and 269 to platinum–etoposide). As of 27 January 2020, the median follow-up was 25·1 months (IQR 22·3–27·9). Durvalumab plus tremelimumab plus platinum–etoposide was not associated with a significant improvement in overall survival versus platinum–etoposide (hazard ratio [HR] 0·82 [95% CI 0·68–1·00]; p=0·045); median overall survival was 10·4 months (95% CI 9·6–12·0) versus 10·5 months (9·3–11·2). Durvalumab plus platinum–etoposide showed sustained improvement in overall survival versus platinum–etoposide (HR 0·75 [95% CI 0·62–0·91]; nominal p=0·0032); median overall survival was 12·9 months (95% CI 11·3–14·7) versus 10·5 months (9·3–11·2). The most common any-cause grade 3 or worse adverse events were neutropenia (85 [32%] of 266 participants in the durvalumab plus tremelimumab plus platinum–etoposide group, 64 [24%] of 265 participants in the durvalumab plus platinum–etoposide group, and 88 [33%] of 266 participants in the platinum–etoposide group) and anaemia (34 [13%], 24 [9%], and 48 [18%]). Any-cause serious adverse events were reported in 121 (45%) participants in the durvalumab plus tremelimumab plus platinum–etoposide group, 85 (32%) in the durvalumab plus platinum–etoposide group, and 97 (36%) in the platinum–etoposide group. Treatment-related deaths occurred in 12 (5%) participants in the durvalumab plus tremelimumab plus platinum–etoposide group (death, febrile neutropenia, and pulmonary embolism [n=2 each]; enterocolitis, general physical health deterioration and multiple organ dysfunction syndrome, pneumonia, pneumonitis and hepatitis, respiratory failure, and sudden death [n=1 each]), six (2%) participants in the durvalumab plus platinum–etoposide group (cardiac arrest, dehydration, hepatotoxicity, interstitial lung disease, pancytopenia, and sepsis [n=1 each]), and two (1%) in the platinum–etoposide group (pancytopenia and thrombocytopenia [n=1 each]).

==== TOPAZ-1 ====
Efficacy was evaluated in TOPAZ-1 (NCT03875235), a randomized, double-blind, placebo-controlled, multiregional trial that enrolled 685 participants with histologically confirmed locally advanced unresectable or metastatic BTC who had not previously received systemic therapy for advanced disease.

Trial demographics were as follows: 56% Asian, 37% White, 2% Black, and 4% other race; 7% Hispanic or Latino; 50% male and 50% female; median age was 64 years (range 20-85) and 47% were 65 years or older. Fifty-six percent had intrahepatic cholangiocarcinoma, 25% had gallbladder cancer, and 19% had extrahepatic cholangiocarcinoma.

The major efficacy outcome measure was overall survival (OS). Tumor assessments were conducted every 6 weeks for the first 24 weeks, then every 8 weeks until confirmed objective disease progression. A statistically significant improvement in OS was demonstrated in participants randomized to receive durvalumab with gemcitabine and cisplatin compared to those randomized to receive placebo with gemcitabine and cisplatin. Median OS was 12.8 months (95% CI: 11.1, 14) and 11.5 months (95% CI: 10.1, 12.5) in the durvalumab and placebo arms, respectively (hazard ratio 0.80; 95% CI: 0.66, 0.97, p=0.021). The median progression-free survival was 7.2 months (95% CI: 6.7, 7.4) and 5.7 months (95% CI: 5.6, 6.7) in the durvalumab and placebo arms, respectively. Investigator-assessed overall response rate was 27% (95% CI: 22–32%) and 19% (95% CI: 15–23%) in the durvalumab and placebo arms, respectively.

==== DUO-E ====
Efficacy was evaluated in DUO-E (NCT04269200), a randomized, multicenter, double-blind, placebo-controlled trial in participants with primary advanced or recurrent endometrial cancer. Participants were randomized (1:1:1) to one of the following treatment arms: durvalumab 1,120 mg with carboplatin plus paclitaxel every three weeks for a maximum of six cycles. Following completion of chemotherapy, participants received durvalumab 1,500 mg every four weeks as maintenance until disease progression; placebo with carboplatin and paclitaxel every three weeks for a maximum of six cycles Following completion of chemotherapy, participants received placebo every four weeks until disease progression; an additional investigational combination regimen.

The most common adverse reactions (>25%) with durvalumab, in combination with carboplatin and paclitaxel, were peripheral neuropathy, musculoskeletal pain, nausea, alopecia, fatigue, abdominal pain, constipation, rash, diarrhea, vomiting, and cough.

==== AEGEAN ====
Efficacy was evaluated in AEGEAN (NCT03800134), a randomized, double-blind, placebo-controlled multicenter trial in 802 patients with previously untreated and resectable squamous or non-squamous NSCLC (Stage IIA to select Stage IIIB [AJCC, 8th edition]). Patients were randomized (1:1) to either durvalumab or placebo, with platinum-based chemotherapy, every 3 weeks for up to 4 cycles (neoadjuvant treatment) followed by either continued single-agent durvalumab or placebo, every 4 weeks for up to 12 cycles (adjuvant treatment).

The major efficacy outcome measures were event-free survival (EFS) by blinded independent central review assessment and pathological complete response (pCR) by blinded central pathology review. Median EFS was not reached (95% CI: 31.9, not estimable [NE]) in the durvalumab arm and 25.9 months (95% CI: 18.9, NE) in the placebo arm (hazard ratio 0.68 [95% CI: 0.53, 0.88]; p-value=0.0039). The pCR rate was 17% (95% CI: 13, 21) and 4.3% (95% CI: 2.5, 7) in the durvalumab and placebo arms, respectively. At the time of the prespecified interim analyses, overall survival (OS) was not formally tested for statistical significance; however, a descriptive analysis revealed no clear detriment.

The most common adverse reactions (≥20%) were anemia, nausea, constipation, fatigue, musculoskeletal pain, and rash. Of the patients who received neoadjuvant durvalumab, 1.7% were unable to receive surgery due to adverse reactions compared with 1% in the placebo arm.

== WHO confirmation of falsified IMFINZI ==
In December 2024, WHO Alert No. 5/2024 similarly flagged counterfeit IMFINZI in Lebanon, Armenia, and Türkiye, confirmed by AstraZeneca’s lab test. All contained no active ingredient, presenting clear harm due to ineffective cancer treatment. In May 2025, the World Health Organization issued Medical Product Alert No. 3/2025: three batches of falsified IMFINZI 500 mg/10 mL were identified in Türkiye, and Iran.

The 2025 Counterfeit medication scandal was a major public health and criminal case in Lebanon involving the smuggling, distribution, and administration of counterfeit cancer drugs. The scandal has raised national and international concern after it was revealed that fake medications were substituted for essential chemotherapy treatments, potentially endangering the lives of hundreds of patients.
