= FM (chemotherapy) =

FM in the context of chemotherapy means a chemotherapy regimen used as first-line therapy in indolent lymphomas. In combination with rituximab it is called R-FM or RFM or FM-R or FMR.

The [R]-FM regimen consists of:

1. Rituximab - an anti-CD20 monoclonal antibody that is able to kill both normal B cells and malignant ones;
2. Fludarabine - an antimetabolite;
3. Mitoxantrone - a synthetic anthracycline analogue (an anthraquinone) that is able to intercalate DNA and prevent mitosis.

This regimen is also sometimes used in some autoimmune disorders that are inherently sensitive to rituximab, fludarabine and mitoxantrone in monotherapies (e.g. multiple sclerosis).

== Dosing regimen ==
Drug	Dose	Mode	Days
Rituximab	375 mg/m^{2}	IV infusion	Day 1
Fludarabine	25 mg/m^{2}	IV infusion	Days 1-3
Mitoxantrone	10 mg/m^{2}	IV infusion	Day 1
