= Sequential high-dose chemotherapy =

- Specialty: Oncology

Sequential high-dose chemotherapy is a chemotherapy regimen consisting of several (2 to 4) sequential monochemotherapies with only one chemotherapeutic agent per course. The idea behind this approach is that when using single-agent chemotherapy, the doctor can easily escalate the dose of the drug to the maximum tolerable dose by the patient, avoiding additive hematological toxicity from chemotherapeutic combinations, and thus improving efficacy. It is mostly used as consolidation therapy for relapsed or refractory lymphomas and relapsed or refractory Hodgkin lymphoma, after DHAP induction. There is also an ongoing trial of this approach in multiple myeloma.

== Dosing regimen ==
Course	Drug	Acronym for the chemotherapy regimen itself	Dose	Mode
First	Cyclophosphamide	HD-CYC	~4500–6000 mg/m^{2}	IV infusion
Second	Methotrexate	HD-MTX	~2500–8000 mg/m^{2}	IV infusion
Third	Cytarabine	HDAC or HD-AraC	~3000–6000 mg/m^{2}	IV infusion
Fourth	Etoposide	HD-ETO	~2000 mg/m^{2}	IV infusion

Depending on the patient's performance status, his/her ability to tolerate chemotherapy, the type of lymphoma, the stage of disease and different prognostic factors, one or more courses of the full sequence can be omitted or dose reduced. After completion of the sequence, the patient will usually undergo pre-transplant conditioning chemotherapy regimen (such as BEAM) and then will get autologous stem cell transplantation as the final consolidation.
