= CEPP =

CEPP is a chemotherapy regimen that is intended for treatment of aggressive non-Hodgkin lymphomas. It consists of cyclophosphamide, etoposide, procarbazine, and prednisone. Unlike CHOP, this chemotherapy regimen does not contain doxorubicin or any other anthracycline. Thus, it can be used in patients with severe cardiovascular diseases and contraindications for doxorubicin-containing regimens. This regimen also does not contain vincristine and can be used in patients with neuropathy.

There are several modifications of CEPP. In combination with bleomycin, this regimen is called CEPP (B). With the further addition of the anti-CD20 monoclonal antibody rituximab, it is called R-CEPP(B).

R-CEPP(B) regimen consists of:

- Rituximab - a monoclonal antibody that is able to kill CD20-positive B cells, either normal or malignant
- Cyclophosphamide - an alkylating antineoplastic agent
- Etoposide- a topoisomerase inhibitor from the epipodophyllotoxin group
- Procarbazine - an alkylating antineoplastic agent
- Prednisone or prednisolone - a glucocorticoid hormone that has the ability to cause apoptosis and lysis of lymphocytes, either normal or malignant
- Bleomycin - an antitumor antibiotic

== R-CEPP(B) dosing regimen ==
| Drug | Dose | Mode | Days |
|---|---|---|---|
| Rituximab | 375 mg/m^{2} | IV infusion | Day 1 |
| Cyclophosphamide | 600 mg/m^{2} | IV infusion | Days 1 and 8 |
| Etoposide | 70 mg/m^{2} | IV infusion | Days 1-3 |
| Procarbazine | 60 mg/m^{2} | PO qd | Days 1-10 |
| Prednisone or prednisolone | 60 mg/m^{2} | PO qd | Days 1-10 |
| Bleomycin | 10 IU/m^{2} | IV bolus | Day 1 |
