= CBV (chemotherapy) =

Chemotherapy regimen

- Specialty: Oncology

CBV refers to Cytoxan (cyclophosphamide), BCNU (carmustine), and VP-16 (etoposide), three drugs in a chemotherapy regimen commonly given to lymphoma patients in conjunction with stem cell therapy.

CBV is usually given in high doses to patients who have relapsed or who have refractory disease and cannot benefit from standard chemotherapy. Since a patient's bone marrow is virtually guaranteed not to survive a course of CBV, the receiving patient must receive a transplant (allogeneic or autologous, depending on his or her condition) of stem cells (formerly referred to as a bone marrow transplant) to replace the patient's own hemopoietic ("blood-forming") stem cells.

== See also ==
- Cancer
- Chemotherapy
- Lymphoma
- Stem cells
- Bone marrow transplant
