= GVD =

GVD may refer to:

- GVD (chemotherapy), a chemotherapy regimen
- Great Victoria Desert
- Group velocity dispersion,
