= DHAP (chemotherapy) =

- Specialty: Oncology

DHAP in context of chemotherapy is an acronym for chemotherapy regimen that is used for remission induction in cases of relapsed or refractory non-Hodgkin lymphoma and Hodgkin lymphoma. It is usually given for 2-3 courses, then followed by high-dose chemotherapy and autologous stem cell transplantation. In combination with anti-CD20 monoclonal antibody rituximab (Rituxan, Mabthera) it is called R-DHAP or DHAP-R.

[R]-DHAP regimen consists of:

1. Rituximab, a monoclonal antibody, directed at B-cell surface antigen CD20
2. Dexamethasone, a glucocorticoid hormone
3. High-dose Ara-C - cytarabine, an antimetabolite;
4. Platinol (cisplatin), a platinum-based antineoplastic, also an alkylating antineoplastic agent.

== Dosing regimen ==
| Drug | Dose | Mode | Days |
|---|---|---|---|
| Rituximab | 375 mg/m^{2} | IV infusion | Day 0 |
| Dexamethasone | 40 mg | PO qd | Days 1-4 |
| High-dose Ara-C - cytarabine | 2000 mg/m^{2} | IV infusion over 2 hrs | Day 2, every 12 hours |
| Platinol (cisplatin) | 100 mg/m^{2} | IV infusion over 24 hrs | Day 1 |
