= FLANG =

FLANG or Flang may refer to:

- Flang, a project to add Fortran support to LLVM, a compiler infrastructure project.
- Florida Air National Guard (FL ANG), US

== See also ==
- FLAG (chemotherapy), a chemotherapy regimen
