= EPOCH (chemotherapy) =

Intensive chemotherapy regimen

EPOCH is an intensive chemotherapy regimen intended for treatment of aggressive non-Hodgkin lymphoma.

It is often combined with rituximab. In this case it is called R-EPOCH or EPOCH-R. The R-EPOCH regimen consists of:

1. Rituximab: an anti-CD20 monoclonal antibody, which has the ability to kill B cells, be they normal or malignant;
2. Etoposide: a topoisomerase inhibitor from the group of epipodophyllotoxins;
3. Prednisolone: a glucocorticoid hormone that can cause apoptosis and lysis of both normal and malignant lymphocytes;
4. Oncovin, also known as vincristine: a vinca alkaloid that binds to the protein tubulin, thereby preventing the formation of microtubules and mitosis;
5. Cyclophosphamide: an alkylating antineoplastic agent;
6. Hydroxydaunorubicin, also known as doxorubicin: an anthracycline antibiotic that is able to intercalate DNA, damaging it and preventing cell division.

== Dosing regimen ==
| Drug | Dose | Mode | Days |
|---|---|---|---|
| Rituximab | 375 mg/m^{2} | IV infusion | Day 1 |
| Etoposide | 50 mg/m^{2} | IV continuous infusion over 24 h | Days 1–4 |
| Prednisolone | 60 mg/m^{2} | By mouth, twice a day (PO BID) | Days 1–5 |
| Oncovin: vincristine | 0.4 mg/m^{2} | IV continuous infusion over 24 h | Days 1–4 |
| Cyclophosphamide | 750 mg/m^{2} | IV bolus given over 15 min | Day 5 |
| Hydroxydaunorubicin: doxorubicin | 10 mg/m^{2} | IV continuous infusion over 24 h | Days 1–4 |

This regimen requires the use of prophylactic antibiotics to prevent infectious complications, as well as the use of colony-stimulating factors (G-CSF) from the first day after the end of chemotherapy to the day of full blood count restoration (ANC > 1000/μL).

There is also an improved version of the regimen. In this version the chemotherapy dose varies from cycle to cycle depending on the patient's ability to tolerate chemotherapy and the degree of neutropenia and thrombocytopenia observed in this patient after each cycle. This approach is called "dose-adjusted EPOCH", or "DA-EPOCH" (DA-EPOCH-R, DA-R-EPOCH or R-DA-EPOCH are used when rituximab is included).

Dose change rules are as follows:

Twice a week a full blood count with white blood cell count (WBC) differential is obtained.

Dose escalation above the starting doses in case of good patient's chemotherapy tolerability applies simultaneously to etoposide, doxorubicin and cyclophosphamide.

Dose de-escalation below the starting doses in case of poor patient's chemotherapy tolerability applies to cyclophosphamide only.

If the nadir ANC > 500/μL, then the doses of etoposide, doxorubicin, and cyclophosphamide for the next cycle are all increased by 20% over the doses used in the previous cycle.

If the nadir ANC < 500/μL on one or two blood checks, but ANC rises above 500 at the time of third check (i.e. the duration of agranulocytosis is less than nine days), and the nadir of platelet count is > 25,000/μL, then the dose for the next course will remain the same.

If the nadir ANC < 500/μL for 10 days or more, or if the nadir platelet count at every time falls below 25,000/μL, then the doses of etoposide, doxorubicin and cyclophosphamide are reduced by 20% below the doses used in the previous cycle, but doxorubicin and etoposide should not be reduced below the initial dose (dose in first course).
