= High-dose chemotherapy =

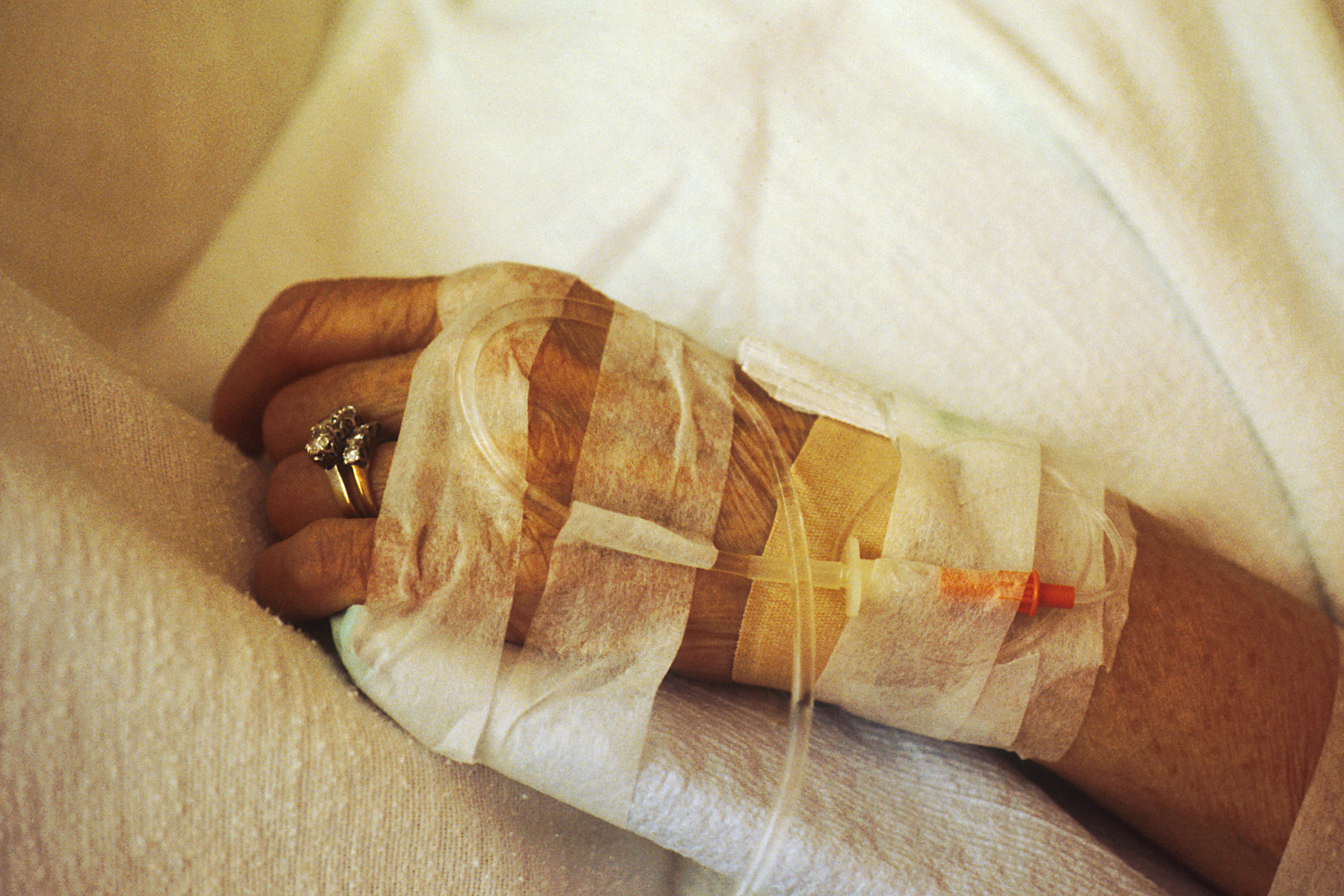
photo showing chemotherapy with chemo infusion

High-dose chemotherapy (HDC) is a regimen of chemotherapy medicines given at larger dosages. This therapeutic strategy is used to treat some cancers, especially those that are aggressive or have a high chance of coming back. With increased doses of chemotherapy chemicals administered to the body, HDC seeks to optimize the death of cancer cells.

It was first explored as a potential treatment option in the field of oncology in the late 1970s. Significant progress has been achieved in the understanding of the best dosage, combinations of drugs, and supportive care methods related to HDC over time. Some of the hazards and side effects that were formerly linked to larger dosages of chemotherapy medications have been lessened thanks to these improvements. Severe suppression of the bone marrow, heightened vulnerability to infections, gastrointestinal toxicity, and more systemic problems were among the possible side effects.

Autologous Stem Cell Transplantation (ASCT), which involves the collection and storage of a patient's own stem cells prior to the administration of HDC, plays a vital role in the treatment process. Once the chemotherapy is completed, the stored stem cells are infused back into the patient's body. This procedure helps to restore the bone marrow and support the recovery of blood cells. ASCT has allowed for the administration of HDC, with improvements in supportive care reducing associated morbidity and mortality.

== Medical uses ==
HDC is known to be effective in treating types of cancer and has been found to enhance patient outcomes. This treatment method is commonly linked with blood cancers like multiple myeloma, Hodgkin's lymphoma, and non-Hodgkin's lymphoma. It is also used in solid tumors such as germ cell tumors and certain high risk or recurrent breast cancers.

Multiple myeloma, a type of plasma cell cancer is an indication for HDC. Typically it follows stem cell transplant (ASCT) once initial therapy shows a positive response. The goal is to extend progression survival and overall survival rates. Clinical trials have validated the effectiveness of this approach making it the standard of care for patients. Research by Attal et al has shown that patients with myeloma who undergo HDC experience significantly improved survival rates compared to those receiving conventional chemotherapy—a strong indicator of HDCs impact.

Moreover, HDC is frequently employed in individuals with refractory Hodgkins and non Hodgkins lymphoma. In these conditions HDC can act as a salvage therapy that proves beneficial, for patients potentially leading to long lasting remission. Schmitz and colleagues important study showed that high dose chemotherapy followed by stem cell transplantation (ASCT) could lead to better outcomes in individuals with recurrent Hodgkins lymphoma.

When it comes to germ cell tumors, particularly testicular cancer, high dose chemotherapy can be used as a treatment option for patients who have experienced a relapse following initial chemotherapy or for those with unfavorable prognostic factors. A research conducted by Einhorn and team demonstrated the effectiveness of high dose chemotherapy in this scenario revealing remissions even in patients, with refractory disease.

Some breast cancer patients, particularly those with high-risk features such as a large number of involved lymph nodes, aggressive tumor biology, or those who do not respond adequately to standard adjuvant therapy, may be considered for HDC. However, the role of HDC in breast cancer is more controversial and is generally reserved for the setting of clinical trials. A meta-analysis by Berry et al. evaluated the role of HDC in breast cancer, noting that certain subgroups of patients might derive benefit, although the overall impact on survival is less clear compared to standard treatments.

The selection of patients for HDC is critical and is based on several criteria. Patients must have a performance status that indicates they can tolerate the rigors of HDC and the subsequent ASCT. They must have adequate organ function, including cardiac, pulmonary, renal, and hepatic functions, as HDC can be toxic to these organs. Age is also a consideration, with younger patients typically tolerating HDC better than older patients; however, biological age and comorbidities are more important than chronological age.

== Mechanism of action ==
The way HDC works involves important processes that together contribute to its potential effectiveness in treating cancer.

=== DNA damage and cell cycle blockage ===
HDC causes damage to the DNA of cancer cells leading to cell cycle arrest. The chemotherapeutic agents utilized in HDC such as alkylating agents and platinum compounds create covalent bonds with DNA resulting in linking and strand breaks. This disruption in DNA processes hinders replication and transcription halting the cell cycle and preventing proliferation of cancer cells. By focusing on DNA HDC has the potential to eliminate cancer cells efficiently.

=== Enhanced drug penetration and availability ===
HDC aims to increase drug concentrations within the tumor microenvironment by using dosages. This increased dosage helps drugs penetrate into the tumor overcoming obstacles like vasculature and interstitial pressure. The improved availability of drugs allows for distribution throughout the tumor mass reaching resistant cancer cells that lower doses might not have affected. As a result HDC increases the likelihood of eradicating all cancer cells, including those that're harder to reach.

=== Depletion of stem cells ===
Apart from attacking cancer cells, HDC can also reduce the population of hematopoietic stem cells (HSCs) found in bone marrow. Hematopoietic stem cells (HSCs) play a role in generating different types of blood cells and their decrease is a result of the strong toxicity of HDC on rapidly multiplying cells. While this may cause a suppression of bone marrow activity it can also target any remaining cancer cells that have spread to the bone marrow lowering the chances of disease recurrence.

=== Synergistic effects ===
When HDC is combined with treatment methods it can produce synergistic effects. For example pairing HDC with stem cell transplantation enables the administration of chemotherapy doses than would be possible without stem cell support. This strategic approach enhances the impact on cancer cells while reducing harm to healthy tissues. The collaboration between HDC and stem cell transplantation has shown promise in cancer types like multiple myeloma and neuroblastoma.

=== Immunomodulatory effects ===
Recent findings suggest that HDC triggers effects that enhance its therapeutic effectiveness. By disrupting the tumor microenvironment HDC releases tumor related antigens and warning signals prompting system activation and boosting immune cell activity such as T cells and natural killer cells, for improved antitumor responses. Moreover HDC may diminish tolerance levels and inhibit immunosuppressive cells potentially strengthening the immune mediated eradication of cancerous cells.

== Side effect ==
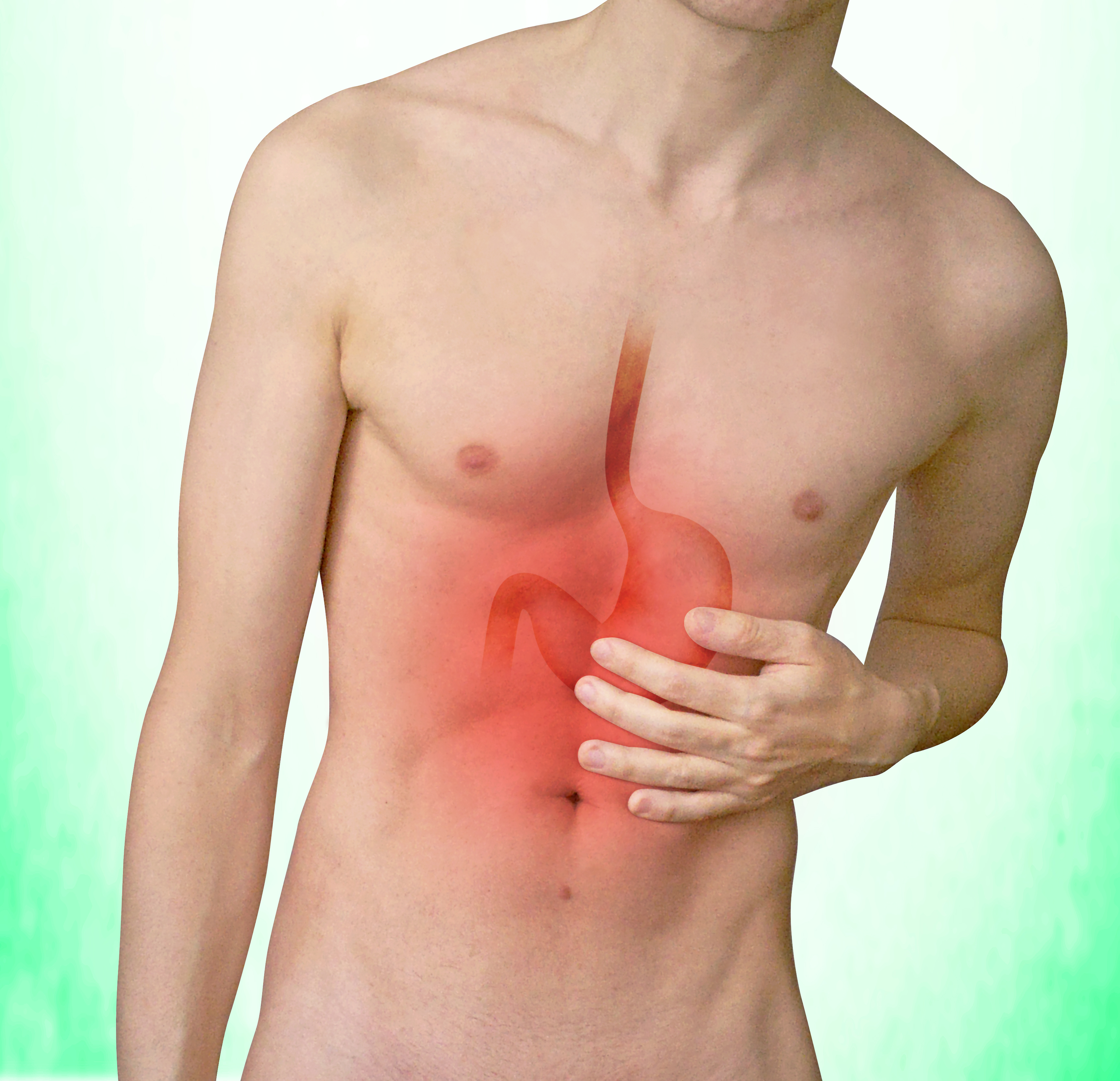
A photo showing stomach pain, which is one of the gastrointestinal issue.

=== Bone marrow suppression ===
HDC can depress bone marrow, which lowers platelets, red blood cells, and white blood cells while raising the risk of bleeding, infections, and anemia. Treatment for cancer frequently has this side effect, which can be managed with the use of cytokines such G-CSF and EPO.

=== Gastrointestinal issues ===
Chemotherapy medications can seriously harm the gastrointestinal system, which can result in a variety of adverse symptoms include nausea, vomiting, diarrhea, and mouth sores. The patient's general health and nutritional state may suffer as a result of these issues. Modulating nutrition has been suggested as a possible approach to lessen these effects; preclinical and clinical research have shown promise for some nutrients as glutamine, ω-3 polyunsaturated fatty acids, and probiotics/prebiotics. It has also been determined that the enteric nervous system, which regulates gastrointestinal processes, may be a viable therapeutic target to lessen the toxicity caused by chemotherapy.

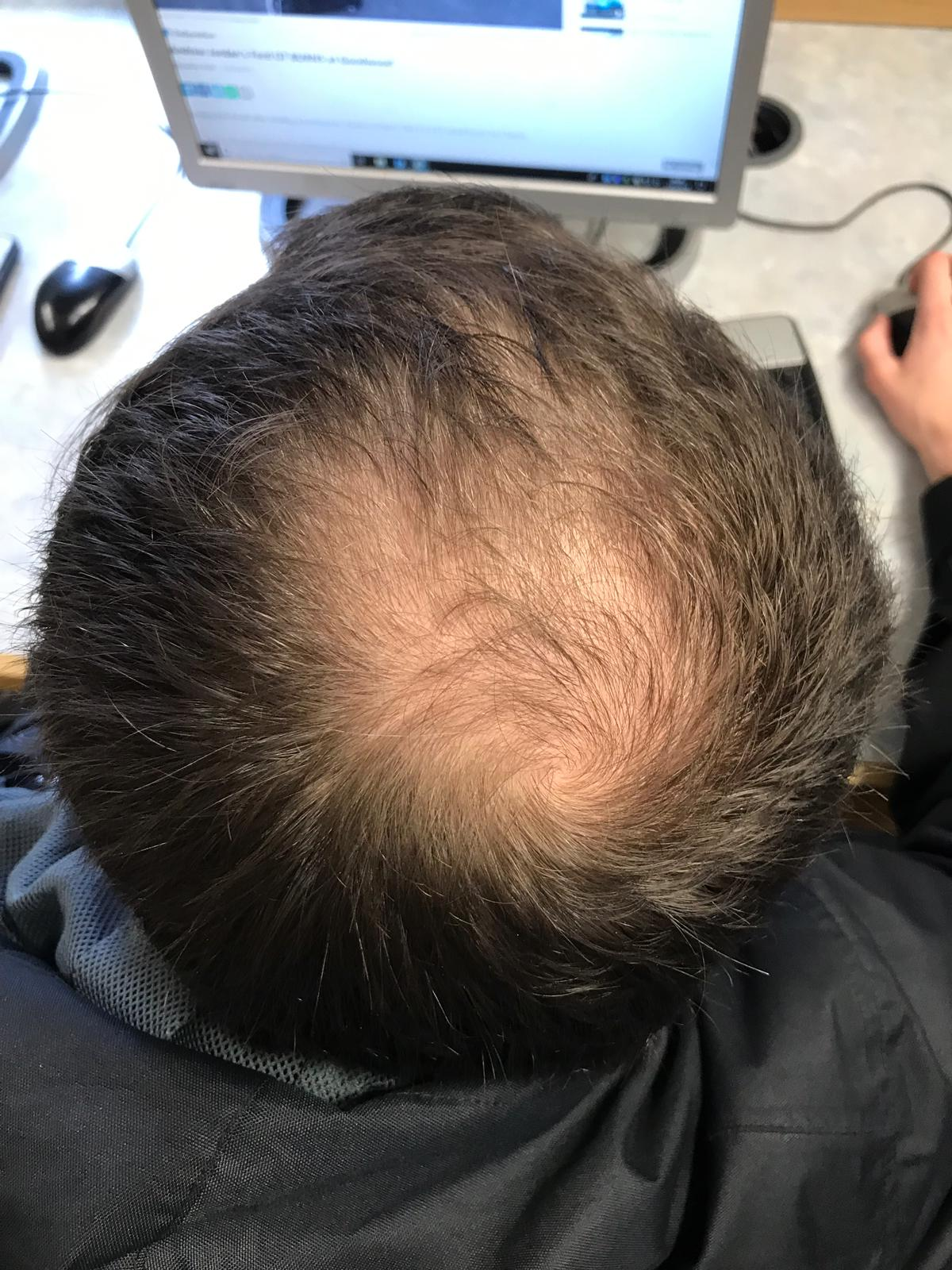
Photo of a male hair loss

=== Hair loss ===
Depending on the particular medications used, HDC can cause hair loss, with different degrees of severity and length. Patients are very concerned about this side effect, especially women, as it can significantly lower their quality of life. It has been found that using scalp cooling to reduce hair loss during chemotherapy works well.

=== Increased susceptibility to infections ===
HDC has the potential to weaken the immune system, making a person more vulnerable to bacterial, viral, and fungal infections. The body's first line of defense against fungal infections is compromised epithelial barriers and the suppression of innate immune cells. Another worry is the antibody-dependent intensification of infections, which is more common in individuals who are neutropenic and is associated with high levels of specific antibodies that predict a higher risk of infectious episodes. Granulocytopenia, which is frequently associated with chemotherapy, is a significant risk factor for infections, with individuals who have lower granulocyte counts having a higher incidence of infections. Genetic differences in the innate immune system may also affect the duration and severity of infectious episodes in people with neutropenia.

=== Fatigue ===
For patients receiving chemotherapy, cancer-related fatigue is a prevalent and crippling problem that drastically lowers quality of life and interferes with daily tasks. This weariness is similar to what healthy people go through, but it's more intense and enduring.

=== Organ toxicity ===
Chemotherapy medications, including methotrexate, cisplatin, streptozotocin, and nitrosoureas, can cause renal and metabolic problems due to their nephrotoxic effects. These medications may also cause renal failure or certain kidney lesions, like those in the glomeruli or tubules. Certain chemotherapy medications might cause hepatotoxic side effects in addition to renal toxicity, which calls for a thorough evaluation of liver function before starting treatment and possible dose adjustments.

== Treatment with ASCT ==
=== Autologous stem cell transplantation (ASCT) ===
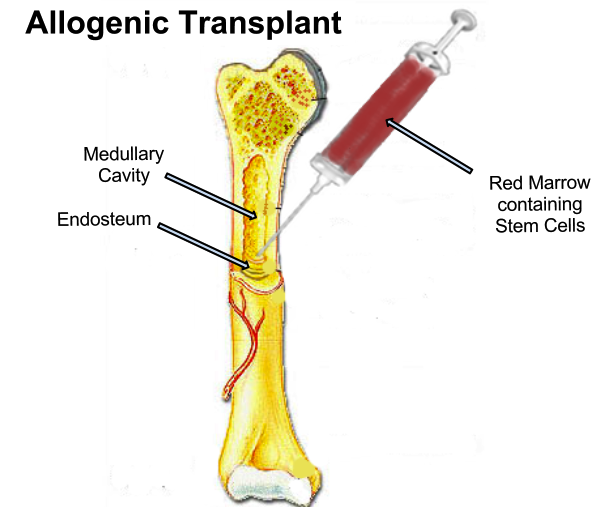
mechanism of bone marrow transplantation

ASCT is a critical component of cancer treatment that frequently follows HDC. This procedure involves the collection and subsequent infusion of a patient's own hematopoietic stem cells (HSCs). ASCT serves as a supportive therapy to restore the patient's bone marrow function and mitigate the hematologic toxicity associated with HDC. This comprehensive overview examines the process, benefits, and limitations of ASCT in the context of HDC-based cancer treatment.

Before the initiation of HDC, the patient undergoes the stem cell collection process, also known as stem cell mobilization. This involves the administration of growth factors, such as granulocyte colony-stimulating factor (G-CSF), which stimulates the release of HSCs from the bone marrow into the peripheral blood. Once the HSCs reach a sufficient concentration in the blood, they are collected through apheresis, a procedure that separates the stem cells from the rest of the blood components. The collected stem cells are cryopreserved for later use during the transplantation phase. Following stem cell collection, the patient receives HDC, which is administered at doses significantly higher than conventional chemotherapy regimens. HDC aims to maximize the cytotoxic effects on cancer cells, but it also causes severe damage to the bone marrow, leading to a depletion of blood cell populations. The intensified chemotherapy targets the tumor cells more effectively, while the patient's normal bone marrow function is temporarily suppressed.

Once the HDC treatment is completed, the cryopreserved autologous stem cells are thawed and infused back into the patient's bloodstream. The infused stem cells then migrate to the bone marrow, where they engraft and begin to restore normal blood cell production. The recovery of the bone marrow function is essential for replenishing the depleted blood cell populations, such as red blood cells, white blood cells, and platelets. Engraftment typically occurs within a few weeks following stem cell infusion. During the engraftment period, patients are closely monitored for hematologic recovery, which includes the return of adequate blood cell counts. Supportive care measures, such as transfusions of blood products and administration of antibiotics or antifungal agents, may be required to manage complications associated with low blood cell counts and immunosuppression. The goal is to provide optimal supportive care until the patient's bone marrow function is fully restored, reducing the risk of complications and infections.

ASCT following HDC has shown several benefits in cancer treatment. It allows for the administration of higher doses of chemotherapy, potentially leading to increased tumor response rates and improved disease control. ASCT also enables the rapid recovery of bone marrow function, reducing the duration of severe hematologic toxicity associated with HDC. This approach has demonstrated efficacy in various malignancies, including lymphomas, multiple myeloma, and certain solid tumors.

ASCT is not suitable for all cancer patients. Factors such as age, overall health status, and the presence of comorbidities must be considered during the evaluation process. Additionally, ASCT is associated with potential risks, including infection, organ toxicity, and graft failure. Therefore, careful patient selection, close monitoring, and appropriate supportive care are crucial to maximize the benefits and minimize the risks associated with this procedure.

== History ==
After being examined in the 1960s and 1970s, the concept of HDC has been the subject of ongoing research and discussion. Although it has been widely used in the treatment of breast cancer, it remains uncertain if it is superior than standard-dose chemotherapy. The goal of boosting the anticancer effects of chemotherapeutic medications, especially in the setting of bone marrow transplantation, has impacted the creation of HDC. The evidence for its efficacy in managing advanced cancer, especially breast carcinoma, is still inconclusive, despite its contentious and widespread use. When treating malignant brain tumors, HDC has been studied as a potential strategy to overcome the poor effectiveness of traditional chemotherapy.

The significant developments in growth factors and supportive care during the 1980s allowed for the development of HDC regimens. The addition of stem cell transplantation—specifically, ASCT—which entails obtaining and preserving a patient's own healthy stem cells prior to the administration of HDC, further broadened this. Autologous peripheral stem cell transplantation is being used more frequently due to its potential advantages, which include a quicker return of bone marrow function and a reduction in the hematological toxicity linked to myelotoxic therapy.

The use of HDC has advanced significantly, especially in the treatment of breast cancer. One significant advancement has been the use of adjuvant polychemotherapy, which includes taxanes and anthracyclines. The best course of action for every given patient is still unknown, though, as financial concerns frequently play a role in treatment choices. The development of metronomic regimens, which entail the consistent delivery of modest dosages of chemotherapy medications, has offered a possible tactic to raise response rates and lower toxicities. With a move toward titrating therapy intensity to limit late effects, there is an increasing emphasis on limiting long-term toxicity in the context of lymphoma treatment.

Recently, there has been a change in cancer treatment toward less toxic, more customized regimens. Metronomic chemotherapy, which involves regularly giving patients low dosages of chemotherapy drugs, is one instance of this. This technique has been shown to have the potential to change the tumor microenvironment and limit tumor growth. It is yet unknown how best to employ metronomic chemotherapy, especially for varied cancer types.
