= Hyper-CVAD =

Hyper-CVAD is a chemotherapy regimen used to treat some forms of leukemia, high-grade non-Hodgkin lymphoma, and lymphoblastic leukemia.

== Summary ==
Hyper-CVAD chemotherapy consists of two combinations of drugs (courses A and B) given in an alternating fashion. The term 'hyper' refers to the hyperfractionated nature of the chemotherapy, which is given in smaller doses, more frequently, to minimize side effects. 'CVAD' is the acronym of the drugs used in course A: cyclophosphamide, vincristine, doxorubicin (also known by its trade name, Adriamycin), and dexamethasone. Course B consists of methotrexate and cytarabine. The protocol was originally developed to treat leukemia in young, fit patients, due to its intensity, but has since begun to be used more widely.

== Indications ==
Hyper-CVAD chemotherapy is generally reserved for use in the treatment of serious and aggressive forms of hematological malignancy. There are serious side effects and complications arising from the administration of the various agents, which require careful management in an appropriate health-care setting. Patients who receive hyper-CVAD receive a careful work-up to assess their overall wellness prior to the commencement of the regimen, in order to minimise undesirable outcomes. Patients considered for the protocol will generally be under 65.

== Administration ==
Each course is given up to 4 times, with up to 8 cycles in total. Each cycle is approximately three weeks apart. The aim is to administer as many cycles as possible or necessary in as short a time as possible. Timing of cycles will be somewhat dependent on the patient's recovery from the last cycle. The regimen is usually administered on an in-patient basis, using a continuous venous access device such as a peripherally inserted central catheter (PICC), a Hickman line, or a port-a-cath. The following is only a general guide; the exact combination of drugs, doses, and protocols used for administration is generally determined on a facility-by-facility basis. Dosage is individualized, based on factors such as body weight, body surface area, and the overall health of the patient.

== Course A ==
- Cyclophosphamide (Cytoxan), an alkylating agent, Days 1, 2, and 3
- Vincristine (Oncovin), a mitotic inhibitor, Days 4 and 11
- Doxorubicin (Adriamycin or Rubex), an antibiotic with anti-tumour effects, Day 4
- Dexamethasone (Decadron), an immunosuppressant, Days 1-4 and 11-14
- Cytarabine or Ara-C (Cytosar), an antimetabolite, Day 7
- Mesna (Uromitexan), a compound used to reduce the incidence of haemorrhagic cystitis, a common side effect of the administration of cyclophosphamide. It is generally given via intravenous infusion or orally at the same time as cyclophosphamide.
- Methotrexate, an antimetabolite, may be given via the intrathecal route when it is necessary to get chemotherapy past the blood–brain barrier.

== Course B ==
- Methotrexate, Day 1
- Leucovorin is used as a 'rescue' agent to prevent excessive cellular damage by methotrexate.
- Sodium bicarbonate is used, beginning the day before methotrexate, to produce a mild metabolic alkalosis, desirable when administering large quantities of methotrexate. Urine pH values will be checked to ensure alkalosis prior to the commencement of methotrexate.
- Cytarabine, Days 2 and 3

== Side effects ==
The side effects of the administration of the chemotherapeutic agents used in hyper-CVAD are complex, and are often dependent on the overall health of the patient.

Hematologic and immune system

The majority of patients will experience a degree of pancytopenia, including anaemia, thrombocytopenia, and leukopenia, due to the myelosuppressive effect of chemotherapy. Anaemia and thrombocytopenia can cause clinical problems, and transfusion of red blood cells and platelets may be necessary supportive therapies. Leukopenia, particularly neutropenia may lead to profound compromise of the immune system until the number of neutrophils recovers. Patients must therefore be vigilant to ensure that they report any fevers to their clinician. Anti-infective drugs are commonly given as a prophylaxis during and between cycles, to prevent against community-acquired infections. Patients are also at risk of hospital-acquired infections, such as methicillin-resistant Staphylococcus aureus (MRSA) and vancomycin-resistant enterococcus (VRE). It is not uncommon for patients to require hospitalisation to treat infections.

Other side effects

Temporary hair loss is a common side effect. Nausea and vomiting are commonly experienced both during and following administration. A variety of antiemetic drugs may be used, including granisetron, ondansetron, metoclopramide, and cyclizine.

Vincristine sometimes causes chemotherapy-induced peripheral neuropathy, a progressive and persistent condition involving tingling numbness, intense pain, and hypersensitivity to cold, beginning in the hands and feet and sometimes involving the arms and legs.
