= Diogo Casimiro =

Portuguese footballer

Personal information
- Full name: Diogo Casimiro da Silva Costa
- Date of birth: 14 December 1998 (age 27)
- Place of birth: Oliveira de Azeméis, Portugal
- Height: 1.76 m (5 ft 9 1/2 in)
- Position: Right-back

Youth career
- 2006–2008: Oliveirense
- 2008–2011: Porto
- 2011–2012: Dragon Force
- 2012–2017: Porto
- 2013–2014: → Padroense (loan)

Senior career*
Years	Team	Apps	(Gls)
2017–2018	Freamunde	19	(1)
2018–2023	Braga B	43	(0)
2023–2025	Oliveirense	42	(3)
2025	Portimonense	1	(0)
2026	Felgueiras	4	(0)
- * Club domestic league appearances and goals as of 20 June 2026

Diogo Casimiro da Silva Costa (born 14 December 1998) is a Portuguese professional footballer who plays as a right-back.

== Football career ==
On 3 November 2018, Casimiro made his debut for Braga B in a 2018–19 LigaPro match against Famalicão.

On 5 July 2023, Casimiro signed for Liga Portugal 2 side Oliveirense, his first youth club.

On 13 June 2025, Casimiro joined Portimonense on a one-season deal.

== Personal life ==
On 31 December 2020, Casimiro was diagnosed with Hodgkin lymphoma. While undergoing chemotherapy, an infection forced him into surgery and a four-day induced coma. He also underwent autologous stem-cell transplantation. Casimiro was able to make a full recovery, returning to training with Braga B in July 2022.
