= FLOT (chemotherapy) =

Chemotherapy regimen

FLOT is a chemotherapy regimen for the treatment of stomach cancer, esophageal cancer, and gastroesophageal junction cancer; made up of the medications fluorouracil, leucovorin, oxaliplatin, and docetaxel.
