= C27H29NO11 =

The molecular formula C_{27}H_{29}NO_{11} (molar mass: 543.52 g/mol, exact mass: 543.1741 u) may refer to:

- Doxorubicin, a drug used in cancer chemotherapy
- Epirubicin, an anthracycline drug used for chemotherapy
