= ESHAP =

Chemotherapy acronym

ESHAP is an acronym for relatively intensive chemotherapy regimen that is used for salvage therapy in relapsed or refractory lymphomas and Hodgkin lymphoma. In combination with monoclonal antibody Rituximab it is called R-ESHAP or ESHAP-R.

R-ESHAP consists of:

1. Rituximab, an anti-CD20-directed monoclonal antibody that kills both normal and malignant B-lymphocytes
2. Etoposide, an epipodophyllotoxin topoisomerase inhibitor
3. Solu-Medrol - Methylprednisolone, which is a glucocorticoid that can lyse lymphocytes
4. High-dose Ara-C - cytarabine
5. Platinol - Cisplatin, a platinum-based antineoplastic agent, also an alkylating antineoplastic agent.

== Dosing regimen ==
Drug	Dose	Mode	Days
Rituximab	375 mg/m^{2}	IV infusion	Day 0
Etoposide	40 mg/m^{2}	IV infusion over 1 hr	Days 1-4
Solu-Medrol - Methylprednisolone	500 mg	IV bolus over 15 min	Days 1-5
High-dose Ara-C — cytarabine	2000 mg/m^{2}	IV infusion over 2 hrs	Day 5
Platinol (cisplatin)	25 mg/m^{2}	IV continuous infusion over 24 hrs	Days 1-4
