= Regimen =

Plan or course of action

A regimen is a plan, or course of action such as a diet, exercise or medical treatment. Examples of regimens include low-salt diets, a course of penicillin is a regimen, and there are many chemotherapy regimens in the treatment of cancer.

== History ==
The work, Regimen in Acute Diseases, attributed to the ancient Greek physician, Hippocrates of Cos, describes the types and usage of medical regimens in his era (400 BCE). This is perhaps the first appearance of the term. PubMed at the US National Library of Medicine lists over 220,000 articles using the term "regimen" from 1892 to January 2013. In the context of medieval medicine, regimen referred to the careful management of habits, diet, and schedule to keep the four humors in equilibrium. By manipulating the six non-naturals (airs, diet, sleep, exercise, evacuation, and emotion) a person could keep track of their physical and mental wellbeing by attending to regimen.

== Usage in statistics ==
In economic statistics, a regimen refers to the selected goods and/or services priced for the purpose of compiling a price index. The most well known example is the consumer price index.
