= Losoxantrone =

Chemical compound

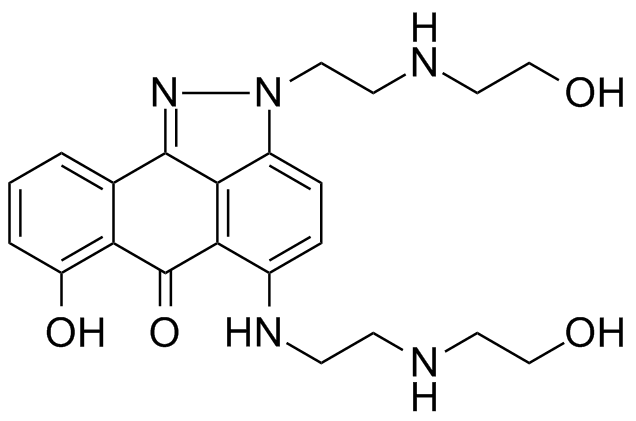

Identifiers
- IUPAC name: 7-Hydroxy-2-{2-[(2-hydroxyethyl)amino]ethyl}-5-({2-[(2-hydroxyethyl)amino]ethyl}amino)dibenzo[cd,g]indazol-6(2H)-one
- CAS Number: 88303-60-0
- PubChem CID: 72116
- ChemSpider: 65094
- UNII: 47KPH00809
- CompTox Dashboard (EPA): DTXSID60236949

Chemical and physical data
- Formula: C_{22}H_{27}N_{5}O_{4}
- Molar mass: 425.489 g·mol^{−1}
- 3D model (JSmol): Interactive image
- SMILES: c1cc-2c(c(c1)O)C(=O)c3c(ccc4c3c2nn4CCNCCO)NCCNCCO
- InChI: InChI=InChI=1S/C22H27N5O4/c28-12-9-23-6-7-25-15-4-5-16-20-19(15)22(31)18-14(2-1-3-17(18)30)21(20)26-27(16)11-8-24-10-13-29/h1-5,23-25,28-30H,6-13H2; Key:YROQEQPFUCPDCP-UHFFFAOYSA-N

Losoxantrone (biantrazole) is an anthroquinone anthrapyrazole antineoplastic agent and analog of mitoxantrone. It is also sometimes known as DuP 941.

== See also ==
- Mitoxantrone
- Piroxantrone
