= DT-PACE =

DT-PACE refers to a chemotherapy regimen for multiple myeloma consisting of Dexamethasone, Thalidomide, Cisplatin or Platinol, Adriamycin or doxorubicin, Cyclophosphamide, and Etoposide.
