= Oesophagogastric junctional adenocarcinoma =

Cancer of the oesophagus

Oesophagogastric junctional adenocarcinoma (OGJ adenocarcinoma) is a cancer of the lower part of the oesophagus with a rising incidence in Western countries. This disease is often linked to Barrett's oesophagus.

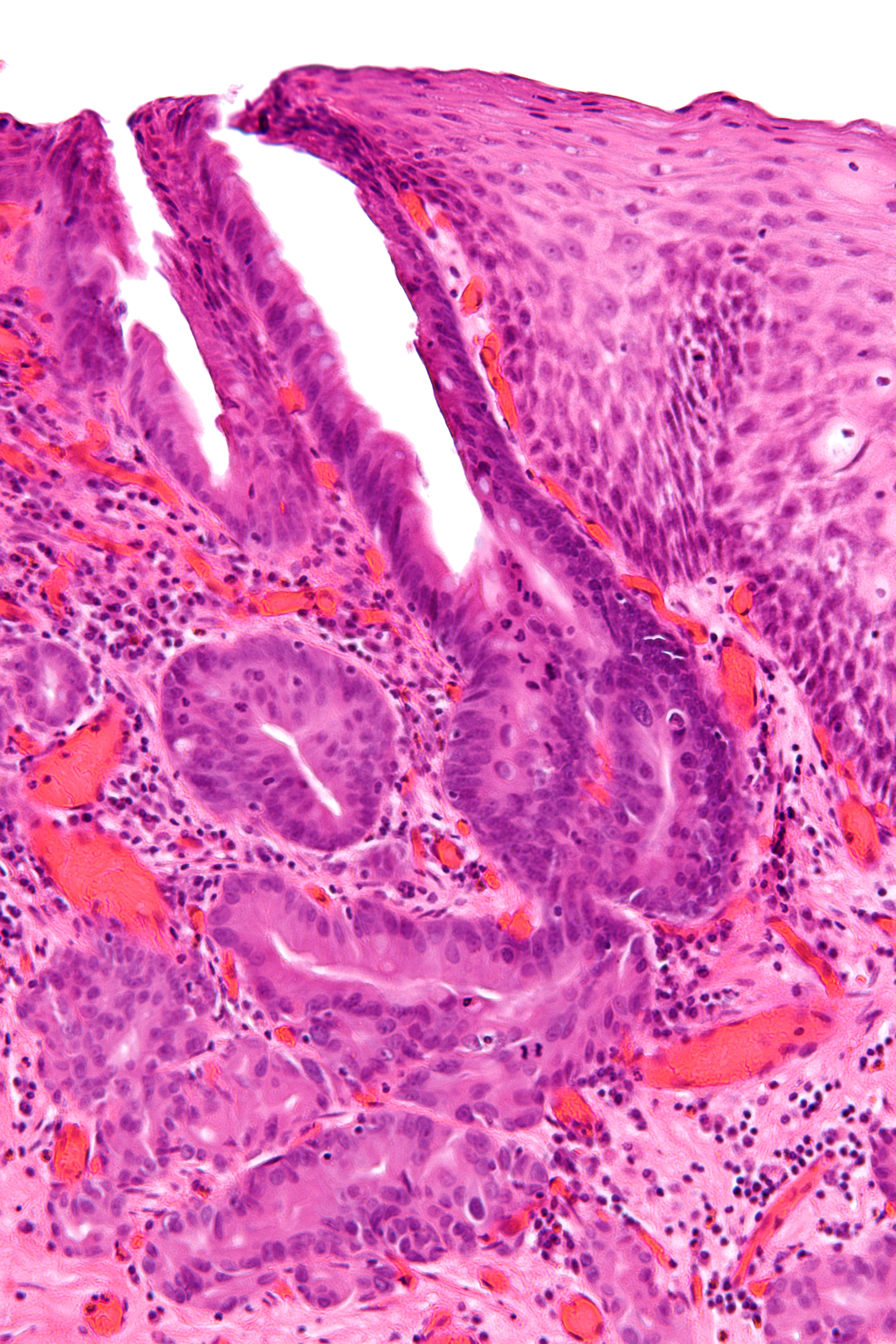
H&E stain of esophageal adenocarcinoma

The incidence of OGJ adenocarcinoma is rising rapidly in Western countries especially in recent decades, in contrast to the declining frequency of distal gastric adenocarcinoma. Treatment options for adenocarcinomas involving the oesophagogastric junction are limited and the overall prognosis is extremely poor, with a five-year survival rate of approximately 30% with surgery alone.

== Risk factors ==
There are several established risk factors for OGJ adenocarcinoma. The biggest risk factors include gastroesophageal reflux disease (GERD) and Barrett's oesophagus. Other risk factors include smoking (with a twofold-increase) and obesity.

Patients with Barrett's esophagus and patients with esophageal/esophagogastric junction adenocarcinoma were found to have significantly more DNA adducts in the distal esophagus than the control group. This finding supports the concept of the carcinogenic potential of chronic gastroesophageal reflux. Oxidative DNA damage is present in the distal oesophagus of patients with Barrett's esophagus and adenocarcinoma of the oesophagus/oesophagogastric junction. The DNA repair protein MGMT (O(6)-methylguanine-DNA methyltransferase) is the major cellular defense against alkylating DNA damage. MGMT single-nucleotide polymorphisms are associated with increased risks of adenoma of the esophagus and esophago-gastric junction. Exposure to acid reflux confers markedly higher risk among homozygous variant genotype carriers. In the proximal stomach of patients with Barrett's esophagus and adenocarcinoma of the esophagus and esophagogastric junction, oxidative stress is elevated and antioxidant capacity is reduced. These observations suggest that the gastroesophageal reflux causing Barrett's esophagus also induces oxidative stress in the proximal stomach and thus may contribute to the development of cancer in the proximal stomach and gastric cardia.

== Clinical features ==
The clinical features of OGJ adenocarcinoma are variable depending on the extent of the tumor. Early stages are oftentimes asymptomatic or have difficulty swallowing. More advanced stages can present with signs and symptoms of anemia, especially iron deficiency anemia from chronic gastrointestinal bleeding, weight loss, cervical adenopathy, hoarseness or change in voice, and progressive difficulty with swallowing (initially with solid foods and then with liquids).

Distant metastases typically occur in the liver, lungs, bones, and adrenal glands and can manifest with symptoms typical of involvement with these sites (e.g. abdominal pain, pathological fractures, dyspnea). However, there have been described cases of atypical metastasis sites including the muscle, brain, and skin.

== Diagnostics ==
The diagnostic workup for OGJ adenocarcinoma usually involves performing an endoscopy with endoscopic biopsy of suspicious looking tissue. Accurate staging of tumor extent and involvement of surrounding tissue or distant metastases is critical to establishing a prognosis, and is usually guided by endoscopic ultrasound, computed tomography scans, and/or positron emission tomography scans to establish the extent of disease. Additionally, genetic analysis of the tumor may yield mutations that may be clinically significant, as described below.

== Classification ==
There is no standardized system for the classification of OGJ adenocarcinoma. The Siewart classification system is a classification scheme used for OGJ adenocarcinomas that has been adopted by many clinicians.

Siewart described three different categories of OGJ adenocarcinoma, all based upon anatomic location:

1. A Type I tumor, located between 5 and 1cm proximal to the OGJ, is an adenocarcinoma that typically arises from an area of intestinal metaplasia of the esophagus and can infiltrate the OGJ from above.
2. A Type II tumor, located between 1cm proximal and 2cm distal to the OGJ, is a true adenocarcinoma of the gastric cardia.
3. A Type III tumor, located between 2 and 5 cm distal to the OGJ is a subcardial gastric carcinoma that typically infiltrates the EGJ from below.

The classification system establishes guidelines for surgical approaches to tumor resection.

== Oncogenetics ==
OGJ adenocarcinoma is a highly mutated and heterogeneous disease. Microsatellite instability (MSI) can be observed and coincides with an elevated number of somatic mutations. Potentially actionable coding mutations have been identified in 67 genes, including those in CR2, HGF, FGFR4 and ESRRB.

Numerous genes harboring somatic coding mutations and copy number changes in the microsatellite stable (MSS) OGJ adenocarcinomas are also known to be altered with similar predicted functional consequence in other tumour types. TP53, SYNE1, and ARID1A are among the most frequently mutated genes.

Notably, up to one third of OGJ adenocarcinomas have been found to have human epidermal growth factor receptor 2 (HER2) overexpression or amplification, which may be targetable with trastuzumab, conferring a modest survival benefit based on initial clinical trials.

== Treatment ==
There is no established consensus on treatment approaches for OGJ adenocarcinoma. The mainstay of treatment is surgical resection, guided by the Siewert classification system, followed by adjuvant chemotherapy for advanced disease.
