= GVD (chemotherapy) =

Chemotherapy regimen for Hodgkin disease patients

GVD is a chemotherapy regimen, used for salvage treatment of relapsed or refractory Hodgkin lymphoma, including those patients who relapse after stem cell transplantation.

The GVD regimen consists of three drugs, from which its name is derived:

1. Gemcitabine;
2. Vinorelbine; and
3. Doxil, a pegylated liposomal formulation of doxorubicin.

== Dosing ==
Drug	Dose in transplant-naive patients	Dose in post-transplant patients	Mode	Days
Gemcitabine	1000 mg/m^{2}	800 mg/m^{2}	IV infusion	Days 1, 8
Vinorelbine	20 mg/m^{2}	15 mg/m^{2}	IV bolus	Days 1, 8
Doxil	15 mg/m^{2}	10 mg/m^{2}	IV infusion	Days 1, 8

Repeated every 21 days (3 weeks).
