= Amsacrine =

Chemical compound

Clinical data
- ATC code: L01XX01 (WHO)

Legal status
- Legal status: US: a

Pharmacokinetic data
- Protein binding: 96 to 98%
- Elimination half-life: 8–9 hours

Identifiers
- IUPAC name: N-(4-(acridin-9-ylamino)-3-methoxyphenyl)methanesulfonamide
- CAS Number: 51264-14-3
- PubChem CID: 2179
- DrugBank: DB00276
- ChemSpider: 2094
- UNII: 00DPD30SOY
- KEGG: D02321
- ChEBI: CHEBI:2687
- ChEMBL: ChEMBL43
- CompTox Dashboard (EPA): DTXSID4022604
- ECHA InfoCard: 100.051.887

Chemical and physical data
- Formula: C_{21}H_{19}N_{3}O_{3}S
- Molar mass: 393.46 g·mol^{−1}
- 3D model (JSmol): Interactive image
- SMILES: O=S(=O)(Nc1ccc(c(OC)c1)Nc2c4c(nc3c2cccc3)cccc4)C
- InChI: InChI=1S/C21H19N3O3S/c1-27-20-13-14(24-28(2,25)26)11-12-19(20)23-21-15-7-3-5-9-17(15)22-18-10-6-4-8-16(18)21/h3-13,24H,1-2H3,(H,22,23); Key:XCPGHVQEEXUHNC-UHFFFAOYSA-N

Amsacrine (synonyms: m-AMSA, acridinyl anisidide) is an antineoplastic agent.

It has been used in acute lymphoblastic leukemia.

== Mechanism ==
Its planar fused ring system can intercalate into the DNA of tumor cells, thereby altering the major and minor groove proportions. These alterations to DNA structure inhibit both DNA replication and transcription by reducing association between the affected DNA and: DNA polymerase, RNA polymerase and transcription factors.

Amsacrine also expresses topoisomerase inhibitor activity, specifically inhibiting topoisomerase II. In contrast, the structurally similar o-AMSA, which differs only in the position of the methoxy substituent on the anilino ring, exhibits limited ability to poison topoisomerase II despite its intercalative properties. This suggests that intercalation alone is insufficient to stabilize topoisomerase II as a covalent complex on DNA.
