= Siewert classification =

System of anatomical classification

The Siewert-Stein classification (often called the Siewert classification in less precise shorthand reference) is a system of anatomical classification used for adenocarcinomas of the esophagogastric junction.

== Classifications ==
=== Type I ===
Adenocarcinoma of the distal part of the esophagus. The tumor center is located 1–5 cm above the gastric cardia.

=== Type II ===
Adenocarcinoma of the real cardia. The tumor center is located 1 cm above or 2 cm below the gastric cardia. Considered to be true gastroesophageal junction.

=== Type III ===
Adenocarcinoma of the subcardial stomach. The tumor center is located 2–5 cm below the gastric cardia.

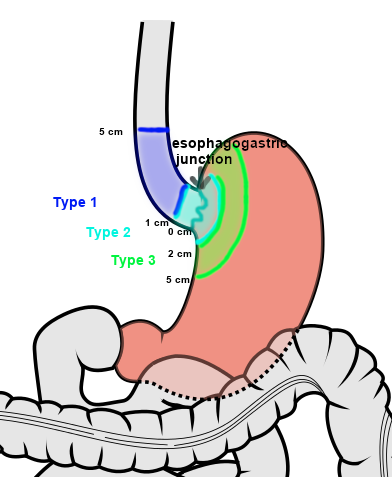
Siewert classification for cancer of the esophagogastric junction.
