= Idarubicin =

Anthracycline antileukemic drug

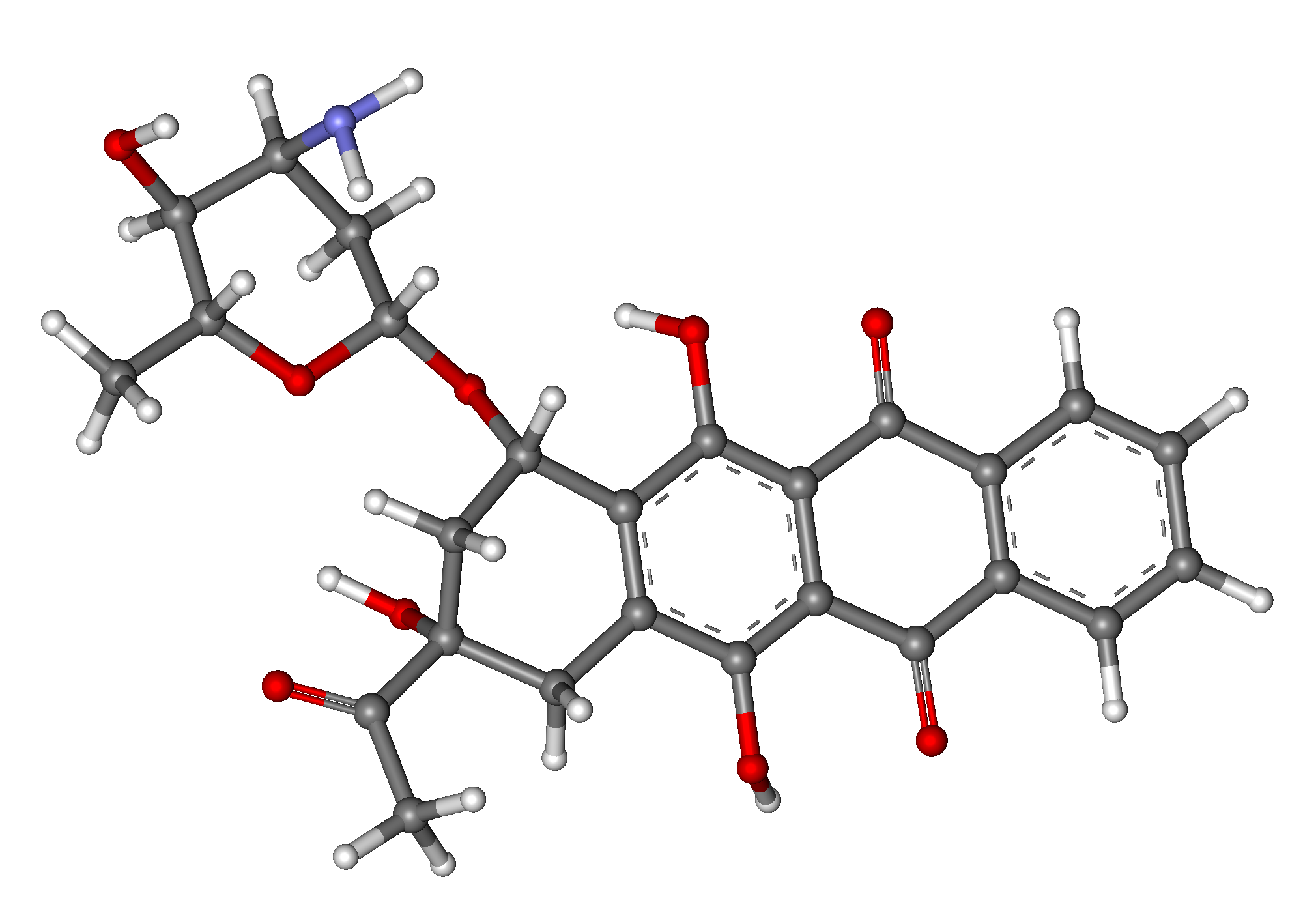

Clinical data
- Other names: 9-acetyl-7-(4-amino-5-hydroxy-6-methyl-tetrahydropyran-2-yl)oxy-6,9,11-trihydroxy-7,8,9,10-tetrahydrotetracene-5,12-dione
- AHFS/Drugs.com: Monograph
- MedlinePlus: a691004
- ATC code: L01DB06 (WHO)

Legal status
- Legal status: US: ℞-only

Pharmacokinetic data
- Protein binding: 97%
- Elimination half-life: 22 hours

Identifiers
- IUPAC name: (1S,3S)-3-acetyl-3,5,12-trihydroxy-6,11-dioxo-1,2,3,4,6,11-hexahydrotetracen-1-yl 3-amino-2,3,6-trideoxo-α-L-lyxo-hexopyranoside
- CAS Number: 58957-92-9
- PubChem CID: 42890
- IUPHAR/BPS: 7083
- DrugBank: DB01177
- ChemSpider: 39117
- UNII: ZRP63D75JW
- KEGG: D08062
- ChEBI: CHEBI:42068
- ChEMBL: ChEMBL1117
- CompTox Dashboard (EPA): DTXSID7023142

Chemical and physical data
- Formula: C_{26}H_{27}NO_{9}
- Molar mass: 497.500 g·mol^{−1}
- 3D model (JSmol): Interactive image
- SMILES: O=C2c1c(O)c5c(c(O)c1C(=O)c3ccccc23)C[C@@](O)(C(=O)C)C[C@@H]5O[C@@H]4O[C@H]([C@@H](O)[C@@H](N)C4)C
- InChI: InChI=1S/C26H27NO9/c1-10-21(29)15(27)7-17(35-10)36-16-9-26(34,11(2)28)8-14-18(16)25(33)20-19(24(14)32)22(30)12-5-3-4-6-13(12)23(20)31/h3-6,10,15-17,21,29,32-34H,7-9,27H2,1-2H3/t10-,15-,16-,17-,21+,26-/m0/s1; Key:XDXDZDZNSLXDNA-TZNDIEGXSA-N

Idarubicin /ˌaɪdəˈruːbɪsɪn/ or 4-demethoxydaunorubicin is an anthracycline antileukemic drug. It inserts itself into DNA and prevents DNA unwinding by interfering with the enzyme topoisomerase II. It is an analog of daunorubicin, but the absence of a methoxy group increases its fat solubility and cellular uptake. Similar to other anthracyclines, it also induces histone eviction from chromatin.

It belongs to the family of drugs called antitumor antibiotics.

It is currently combined with cytosine arabinoside as a first line treatment of acute myeloid leukemia.

It is used for treatment of acute lymphoblastic leukemia and chronic myelogenous leukemia in blast crisis.

It is distributed under the trade names Zavedos (UK) and Idamycin (USA).

== Side effects ==
Diarrhea, stomach cramps, nausea and vomiting are common among patients treated with idarubicin.
