= Ifosfamide =

Chemotherapy medication

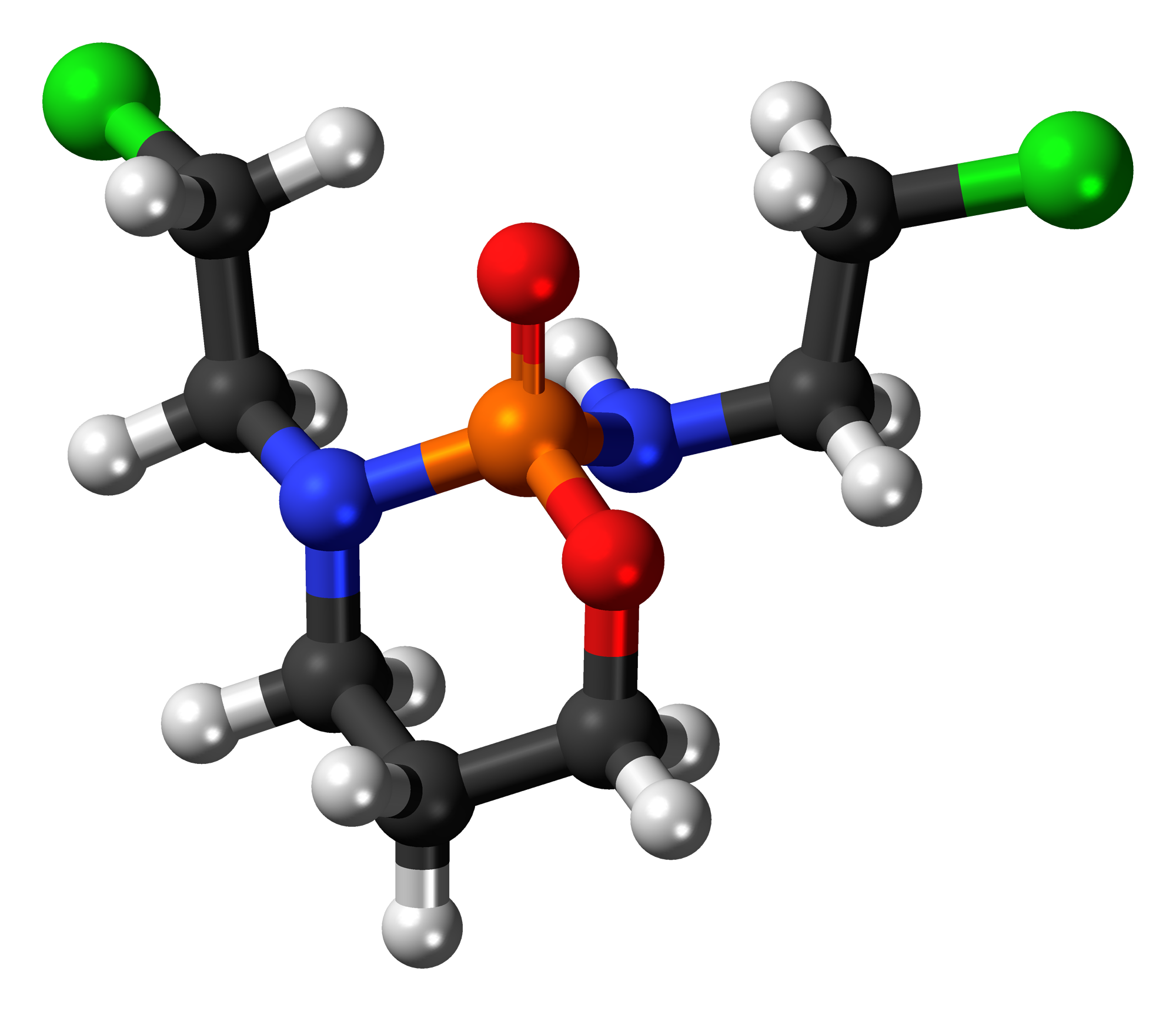
- (R)-(+)- and (S)-(−)-ifosfamide (top), (S)-(−)-ifosfamide (bottom)

Clinical data
- Pronunciation: /aɪˈfɒsfəmaɪd/
- Trade names: Ifex, others
- Other names: IFO, 3-(2-chloroethyl)-2-[(2-chloroethyl)amino]tetrahydro-2H-1,3,2-oxazaphosphorine 2-oxide
- AHFS/Drugs.com: Monograph
- MedlinePlus: a695023
- Pregnancy category: AU: D
- Routes of administration: Intravenous
- ATC code: L01AA06 (WHO)

Legal status
- Legal status: AU: S4 (Prescription only); CA: ℞-only; NZ: Prescription medicine; UK: POM (Prescription only); US: ℞-only

Pharmacokinetic data
- Bioavailability: 100%
- Metabolism: Liver
- Elimination half-life: 60–80% in 72 hours
- Excretion: Kidney

Identifiers
- IUPAC name: N,3-Bis(2-chloroethyl)-1,3,2-oxazaphosphinan-2-amide 2-oxide
- CAS Number: 3778-73-2
- PubChem CID: 3690
- IUPHAR/BPS: 7201
- DrugBank: DB01181
- ChemSpider: 3562
- UNII: UM20QQM95Y
- KEGG: D00343
- ChEBI: CHEBI:5864
- ChEMBL: ChEMBL1024
- CompTox Dashboard (EPA): DTXSID7020760
- ECHA InfoCard: 100.021.126

Chemical and physical data
- Formula: C_{7}H_{15}Cl_{2}N_{2}O_{2}P
- Molar mass: 261.08 g·mol^{−1}
- 3D model (JSmol): Interactive image
- SMILES: O=P1(OCCCN1CCCl)NCCCl
- InChI: InChI=1S/C7H15Cl2N2O2P/c8-2-4-10-14(12)11(6-3-9)5-1-7-13-14/h1-7H2,(H,10,12); Key:HOMGKSMUEGBAAB-UHFFFAOYSA-N

Ifosfamide, sold under the brand name Ifex among others, is a chemotherapy medication used to treat a number of types of cancer. This includes testicular cancer, soft tissue sarcoma, osteosarcoma, bladder cancer, small cell lung cancer, cervical cancer, and ovarian cancer. It is administered by injection into a vein.

Common side effects include hair loss, vomiting, blood in the urine, infections, and kidney problems. Other severe side effects include bone marrow suppression and decreased level of consciousness. Use during pregnancy will likely result in harm to the baby. Ifosfamide is in the alkylating agent and nitrogen mustard family of medications. It works by disrupting the duplication of DNA and the creation of RNA.

Ifosfamide was approved for medical use in the United States in 1987. It is on the World Health Organization's List of Essential Medicines.

== Medical uses ==
It is given as a treatment for a variety of cancers, including:

- Testicular cancer
- Breast cancer
- Lymphoma (Hodgkin and non-Hodgkin)
- Soft tissue sarcoma
- Osteosarcoma or bone tumor
- Lung cancer
- Cervical cancer
- Ovarian cancer

=== Administration ===
It is a white powder which, when prepared for use in chemotherapy, becomes a clear, colorless fluid. The delivery is intravenous.

Ifosfamide is often used in conjunction with mesna to avoid internal bleeding in the patient, in particular hemorrhagic cystitis.

Ifosfamide is given quickly, and in some cases can be given as quickly as an hour.

== Mechanism of action ==
Ifosfamide is a DNA-damaging alkylating agent, belonging to the same class of chemotherapy drugs as cyclophosphamide. It is a prodrug, meaning that It has to be converted by CYP450 into its main active metabolites-(Iso)phosphoramide mustards. These metabolites form DNA cross links mainly at Guanine N-7 positions.

== Side effects ==
Hemorrhagic cystitis is rare when ifosfamide is given with mesna. A common and dose-limiting side effect is encephalopathy (brain dysfunction). It occurs in some form in up to 50% of people receiving the agent. The reaction is probably mediated by chloroacetaldehyde, one of the breakdown products of the ifosfamide molecule, which has chemical properties similar to acetaldehyde and chloral hydrate. The symptoms of ifosfamide encephalopathy can range from mild (difficulty concentrating, fatigue), to moderate (delirium, psychosis), to severe (nonconvulsive status epilepticus or coma). In children, this can interfere with neurological development. Apart from the brain, ifosfamide can also affect peripheral nerves. The severity of the reaction can be classified according to either the National Cancer Institute or the Meanwell criteria (grade I–IV). Previous brain problems and low levels of albumin in the blood increase the likelihood of ifosfamide encephalopathy. In most cases, the reaction resolves spontaneously within 72 hours. If it develops during an infusion of the drug, discontinuing the infusion is advised. The most effective treatment for severe (grade III–IV) encephalopathy is an intravenous solution of methylene blue, which appears to shorten the duration of encephalopathy; the exact mechanism of action of methylene blue is unclear. In some cases, methylene blue may be used as a prophylaxis before further doses of ifosfamide are administered. Other treatments include albumin and thiamine, and dialysis as a rescue modality.

Ifosfamide may also cause a normal anion gap acidosis, specifically renal tubular acidosis type 2.
