= Fludarabine =

Chemical compound

Clinical data
- Trade names: Fludara, others
- AHFS/Drugs.com: Monograph
- MedlinePlus: a692003
- Routes of administration: Intravenous, by mouth
- ATC code: L01BB05 (WHO)

Legal status
- Legal status: AU: S4 (Prescription only); CA: ℞-only; UK: POM (Prescription only); US: ℞-only

Pharmacokinetic data
- Bioavailability: 55%
- Protein binding: 19 to 29%
- Elimination half-life: 20 hours
- Excretion: Kidney

Identifiers
- IUPAC name: (2R,3S,4S,5R)-2-(6-amino-2-fluoropurin-9-yl)-5-(hydroxymethyl)oxolane-3,4-diol
- CAS Number: 21679-14-1
- PubChem CID: 657237
- IUPHAR/BPS: 4802
- DrugBank: DB01073
- ChemSpider: 571392
- UNII: P2K93U8740
- KEGG: D01907
- ChEBI: CHEBI:63599
- ChEMBL: ChEMBL1568
- CompTox Dashboard (EPA): DTXSID2023060
- ECHA InfoCard: 100.123.703

Chemical and physical data
- Formula: C_{10}H_{12}FN_{5}O_{4}
- Molar mass: 285.235 g·mol^{−1}
- 3D model (JSmol): Interactive image
- SMILES: Fc1nc(c2ncn(c2n1)[C@@H]3O[C@@H]([C@@H](O)[C@@H]3O)CO)N
- InChI: InChI=1S/C10H12FN5O4/c11-10-14-7(12)4-8(15-10)16(2-13-4)9-6(19)5(18)3(1-17)20-9/h2-3,5-6,9,17-19H,1H2,(H2,12,14,15)/t3-,5-,6+,9-/m1/s1; Key:HBUBKKRHXORPQB-FJFJXFQQSA-N

Fludarabine is a purine analogue and antineoplastic agent. It is generally used as its 5-O-phosphorylated form known as fludarabine phosphate, sold under the brand name Fludara among others. It is a chemotherapy medication used in the treatment of leukemia and lymphoma. These include chronic lymphocytic leukemia, non-Hodgkin's lymphoma, acute myeloid leukemia, and acute lymphocytic leukemia. It is given by injection into a vein or by mouth.

Common side effects include nausea, diarrhea, fever, rash, shortness of breath, numbness, vision changes, and feeling tired. Severe side effects include brain dysfunction, low blood cell counts, and lung inflammation. Use in pregnancy will likely result in harm to the fetus. Fludarabine is in the purine analog family of medications and works by interfering with the duplication of DNA.

Fludarabine was approved for medical use in the United States in 1991. It is on the World Health Organization's List of Essential Medicines.

== Medical uses ==
Fludarabine is highly effective in the treatment of chronic lymphocytic leukemia, producing higher response rates than alkylating agents such as chlorambucil alone. Fludarabine is used in various combinations with cyclophosphamide, mitoxantrone, dexamethasone and rituximab in the treatment of indolent non-Hodgkin's lymphomas. As part of the FLAG or FLAMSA regimen, fludarabine is used together with cytarabine and granulocyte colony-stimulating factor in the treatment of acute myeloid leukaemia. Because of its immunosuppressive effects, fludarabine is also used in some conditioning regimens prior to allogeneic stem cell transplant.

== Side effects ==
Fludarabine is associated with profound lymphopenia, and as a consequence, increases the risk of opportunistic infections. People who have been treated with fludarabine will usually be asked to take co-trimoxazole or to use monthly nebulised pentamidine to prevent Pneumocystis jiroveci pneumonia. The profound lymphopenia caused by fludarabine renders patients susceptible to transfusion-associated graft versus host disease, an oftentimes fatal complication of blood transfusion. For this reason, all patients who have ever received fludarabine should only be given irradiated blood components.

Fludarabine causes anemia, thrombocytopenia and neutropenia, requiring regular blood count monitoring. Some patients require blood and platelet transfusion, or G-CSF injections to boost neutrophil counts.

Fludarabine is associated with the development of severe autoimmune hemolytic anemia in a proportion of patients.

Difficulties are often encountered when harvesting peripheral blood stem cells from patients previously treated with fludarabine.

== Pharmacology ==
Fludarabine is a purine analog, and can be given both orally and intravenously. Fludarabine inhibits DNA synthesis by interfering with ribonucleotide reductase and DNA polymerase. It is active against both dividing and resting cells. Being phosphorylated, fludarabine is ionized at physiologic pH and is effectually trapped in blood. This provides some level of specificity for blood cells, both cancerous and healthy.

== History ==
Fludarabine was produced by John Montgomery and Kathleen Hewson of the Southern Research Institute in 1968.

== Names ==
Fludarabine is generally administered as its 5-O-phosphorylated form known as fludarabine phosphate, which is rapidly dephosphorylated to fludarabine in the plasma.
