= Mesna =

Chemical compound

Clinical data
- Pronunciation: /ˈmɛznə/
- AHFS/Drugs.com: Monograph
- Pregnancy category: AU: B1
- Routes of administration: By mouth, intravenous
- ATC code: R05CB05 (WHO) V03AF01 (WHO)

Legal status
- Legal status: AU: S4 (Prescription only); UK: POM (Prescription only); US: ℞-only

Pharmacokinetic data
- Bioavailability: 45–79% (by mouth)
- Metabolism: Oxidised in circulation
- Elimination half-life: 0.36–8.3 hours
- Excretion: kidney

Identifiers
- IUPAC name: sodium 2-sulfanylethanesulfonate
- CAS Number: 19767-45-4
- PubChem CID: 29769
- DrugBank: DB09110
- ChemSpider: 27663
- UNII: NR7O1405Q9
- KEGG: D01459
- ChEMBL: ChEMBL975
- CompTox Dashboard (EPA): DTXSID1020809
- ECHA InfoCard: 100.039.336

Chemical and physical data
- Formula: C_{2}H_{5}NaO_{3}S_{2}
- Molar mass: 164.17 g·mol^{−1}
- 3D model (JSmol): Interactive image
- SMILES: [Na+].[O-]S(=O)(=O)CCS
- InChI: InChI=1S/C2H6O3S2.Na/c3-7(4,5)2-1-6;/h6H,1-2H2,(H,3,4,5);/q;+1/p-1; Key:XOGTZOOQQBDUSI-UHFFFAOYSA-M

Mesna, sold under the brand name Mesnex among others, is a medication used in those taking cyclophosphamide or ifosfamide to decrease the risk of bleeding from the bladder. It is used either by mouth or injection into a vein.

Common side effects include headache, vomiting, sleepiness, loss of appetite, cough, rash, and joint pain. Serious side effects include allergic reactions. Use during pregnancy appears to be safe for the baby but this use has not been well studied. Mesna is an organosulfur compound. It works by altering the breakdown products of cyclophosphamide and ifosfamide found in the urine making them less toxic.

Mesna was approved for medical use in the United States in 1988. It is on the World Health Organization's List of Essential Medicines.

== Medical uses ==
=== Chemotherapy adjuvant ===
Mesna is used therapeutically to reduce the incidence of haemorrhagic cystitis and haematuria when a patient receives ifosfamide or cyclophosphamide for cancer chemotherapy. These two anticancer agents, in vivo, may be converted to urotoxic metabolites, such as acrolein.

Mesna assists to detoxify these metabolites by reaction of its sulfhydryl group with α,β-unsaturated carbonyl containing compounds such as acrolein. This reaction is known as a Michael addition. Mesna also increases urinary excretion of cysteine.

=== Other ===
Outside North America, mesna is also used as a mucolytic agent, working in the same way as acetylcysteine; it is sold for this indication as Mistabron and Mistabronco.

== Administration ==
It is administered intravenously or orally (through the mouth). The IV mesna infusions would be given with IV ifosfamide, while oral mesna would be given with oral cyclophosphamide. The oral doses must be double the intravenous (IV) mesna dose due to bioavailability issues. The oral preparation allows patients to leave the hospital sooner, instead of staying four to five days for all the IV mesna infusions.

== Mechanism of action ==
Mesna reduces the toxicity of urotoxic compounds that may form after chemotherapy administration. Mesna is a water-soluble compound with antioxidant properties, and is given concomitantly with the chemotherapeutic agents cyclophosphamide and ifosfamide. Mesna concentrates in the bladder where acrolein accumulates after administration of chemotherapy and through a Michael addition, forms a conjugate with acrolein and other urotoxic metabolites. This conjugation reaction inactivates the urotoxic compounds to harmless metabolites. The metabolites are then excreted in the urine.

== Names ==
It is marketed by Baxter as Uromitexan and Mesnex. The name of the substance is an acronym for 2-mercaptoethane sulfonate Na (Na being the chemical symbol for sodium).

== See also ==
- Coenzyme M—a coenzyme with the same structure used by methanogenic bacteria
