= Autologous stem-cell transplantation =

Medical procedure

Autologous stem-cell transplantation (also called autogenous, autogenic, or autogenic stem-cell transplantation and abbreviated auto-SCT) is the autologous transplantation of stem cells—that is, transplantation in which stem cells (undifferentiated cells from which other cell types develop) are removed from a person, stored, and later given back to that same person.

Although it is most frequently performed with hematopoietic stem cells (precursors of blood-forming cells) in hematopoietic stem cell transplantation, cardiac cells have also been used successfully to repair damage caused by heart attacks.

Autologous stem-cell transplantation is distinguished from allogenic stem cell transplantation where the donor and the recipient of the stem cells are different people.

It can be also used as an Assisted reproductive technology to improve the reproductive outcomes. In a first step the bone marrow derived stem cells are mobilized. After that they will be isolated from the peripheral blood by apheresis. The treated stem cells will then be infused into the ovarian artery through catheterism.

== See also ==
- Autologous hematopoietic stem-cell transplantation
- Stem-cell therapy
