= Medical case management =

Form of case management used in the medical field

Medical case management is a collaborative process that facilitates recommended treatment plans to assure the appropriate medical care is provided to disabled, ill or injured individuals. It is a role frequently overseen by patient advocates.

It refers to the planning and coordination of health care services appropriate to achieve the goal of medical rehabilitation. Medical case management may include, but is not limited to, care assessment, including personal interview with the injured employee, and assistance in developing, implementing and coordinating a medical care plan with health care providers, as well as the employee and his/her family and evaluation of treatment results.

Medical case management requires the evaluation of a medical condition, developing and implementing a plan of care, coordinating medical resources, communicated healthcare needs to the individual, monitors an individual's progress and promotes cost-effective care.

The term also has usage in the USA health care system, referring to the case management coordination in the managed care environment.

== See also ==
- Case management (mental health)
- Disease management (health)
- Case management (US healthcare system)
