= Mitoxantrone =

Chemical compound

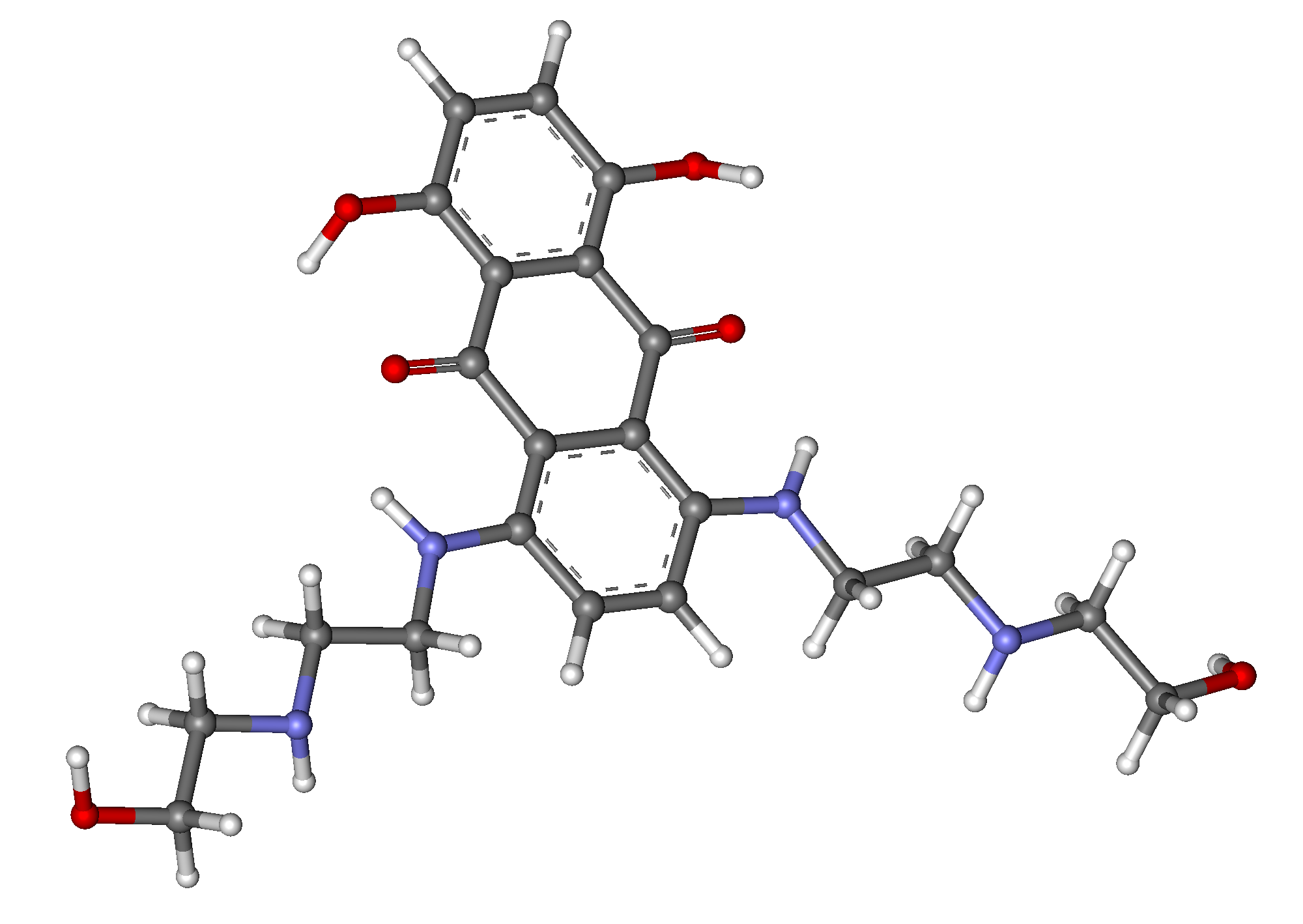

Clinical data
- Trade names: Novantrone
- AHFS/Drugs.com: Monograph
- MedlinePlus: a608019
- Routes of administration: Mainly intravenous
- ATC code: L01DB07 (WHO)

Legal status
- Legal status: In general: ℞ (Prescription only)

Pharmacokinetic data
- Bioavailability: n/a
- Protein binding: 78%
- Metabolism: Hepatic (CYP2E1)
- Elimination half-life: 75 hours
- Excretion: Renal

Identifiers
- IUPAC name: 1,4-dihydroxy-5,8-bis[2-(2-hydroxyethylamino) ethylamino]-anthracene-9,10-dione
- CAS Number: 65271-80-9
- PubChem CID: 4212
- IUPHAR/BPS: 7242
- DrugBank: DB01204
- ChemSpider: 4067
- UNII: BZ114NVM5P
- KEGG: D08224
- ChEBI: CHEBI:50729
- ChEMBL: ChEMBL58
- PDB ligand: MIX (PDBe, RCSB PDB)
- CompTox Dashboard (EPA): DTXSID4046947

Chemical and physical data
- Formula: C_{22}H_{28}N_{4}O_{6}
- Molar mass: 444.488 g·mol^{−1}
- 3D model (JSmol): Interactive image
- SMILES: O=C2c1c(c(NCCNCCO)ccc1NCCNCCO)C(=O)c3c2c(O)ccc3O
- InChI: InChI=1S/C22H28N4O6/c27-11-9-23-5-7-25-13-1-2-14(26-8-6-24-10-12-28)18-17(13)21(31)19-15(29)3-4-16(30)20(19)22(18)32/h1-4,23-30H,5-12H2; Key:KKZJGLLVHKMTCM-UHFFFAOYSA-N

Mitoxantrone (INN, BAN, USAN; also known as Mitozantrone in Australia; trade name Novantrone) is an anthracenedione antineoplastic agent.

== Uses ==
Mitoxantrone is used to treat certain types of cancer, mostly acute myeloid leukemia. It improves the survival rate of children suffering from acute lymphoblastic leukemia relapse.

The combination of mitoxantrone and prednisone is approved as a second-line treatment for metastatic hormone-refractory prostate cancer. This combination was once the first line of treatment; however, a combination of docetaxel and prednisone improves survival rates and lengthens the disease-free period.

Mitoxantrone is also used to treat multiple sclerosis (MS), most notably the subset of the disease known as secondary-progressive MS. In the absence of a cure, mitoxantrone is effective in slowing the progression of secondary-progressive MS and extending the time between relapses in both relapsing-remitting MS and progressive-relapsing MS.

== Side effects ==
Mitoxantrone, as with other drugs in its class, may cause adverse reactions of varying severity, including nausea, vomiting, hair loss, heart damage and immunosuppression, possibly with delayed onset. Cardiomyopathy is a particularly concerning effect as it is irreversible; thus regular monitoring with echocardiograms or MUGA scans is recommended for patients.

Because of the risk of cardiomyopathy, mitoxantrone carries a limit on the cumulative lifetime dose (based on body surface area) in MS patients.

== Mechanism of action ==
Mitoxantrone is a type II topoisomerase inhibitor; it disrupts DNA synthesis and DNA repair in both healthy cells and cancer cells by intercalation between DNA bases. It is also classified as an antibiotic.

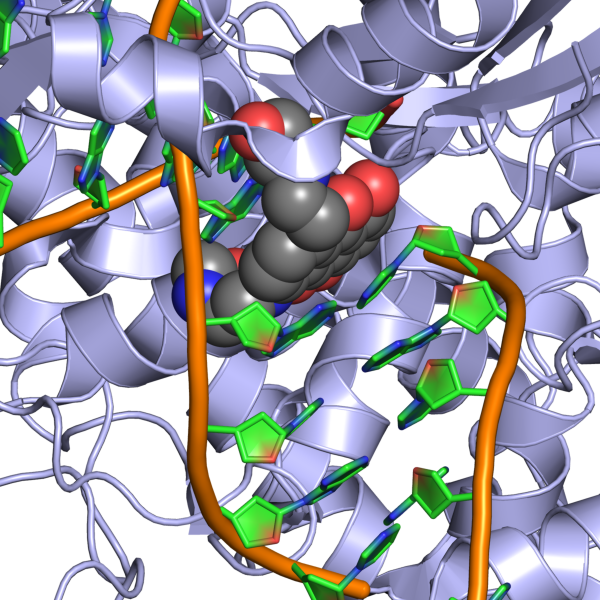
Human topoisomerase II beta in complex with DNA and mitoxantrone. PDB entry 4g0v. Detail showing mitoxantrone (spheres) intercalated with DNA.

== See also ==
- Pixantrone, a mitoxantrone analogue under development
- Losoxantrone
