= Relapse =

Return of a sign, symptom, or disease after a remission

In internal medicine, relapse or recidivism is a recurrence of a past (typically medical) condition. For example, multiple sclerosis and malaria often exhibit peaks of activity and sometimes very long periods of dormancy, followed by relapse or recrudescence.

In psychiatry, relapse or reinstatement of drug-seeking behavior, is the recurrence of pathological drug use, self harm or other symptoms after a period of recovery. Relapse is often observed in individuals who have developed a drug addiction or a form of drug dependence, as well as those who have a mental disorder.

== Risk factors ==
=== Dopamine D2 receptor availability ===
The availability of the dopamine receptor D2 plays a role in self-administration and the reinforcing effects of cocaine and other stimulants. The D2 receptor availability has an inverse relationship to the vulnerability of reinforcing effects of the drug. With the D2 receptors becoming limited, the user becomes more susceptible to the reinforcing effects of cocaine. It is currently unknown if a predisposition to low D2 receptor availability is possible; however, most studies support the idea that changes in D2 receptor availability are a result, rather than a precursor, of cocaine use. It has also been noted that D2 receptors may return to the level existing prior to drug exposure during long periods of abstinence, a fact which may have implications in relapse treatment.

=== Social hierarchy ===
Social interactions, such as the formation of linear dominance hierarchies, also play a role in vulnerability to substance use. Animal studies suggest that there exists a difference in D2 receptor availability between dominant and subordinate animals within a social hierarchy as well as a difference in the function of cocaine to reinforce self-administration in these animal groups. Socially dominant animals exhibit higher availability of D2 receptors and fail to maintain self-administration.

== Triggers ==
Drug taking and relapse are heavily influenced by a number of factors including the pharmacokinetics, dose, and neurochemistry of the drug itself as well as the drug taker’s environment and drug-related history. Reinstatement of drug use after a period of non-use or abstinence is typically initiated by one or a combination of the three main triggers: stress, re-exposure to the drug or drug-priming, and environmental cues. These factors may induce a neurochemical response in the drug taker that mimics the drug and thus triggers reinstatement. These cues may lead to a strong desire or intention to use the drug, a feeling termed craving by Abraham Wikler in 1948. The propensity for craving is heavily influenced by all three triggers to relapse and is now an accepted hallmark of substance dependence. Stress is one of the most powerful stimuli for reinstating drug use because stress cues stimulate craving and drug-seeking behavior during abstinence. Stress-induced craving is also predictive of time to relapse. Comparably, addicted individuals show an increased susceptibility to stressors than do non-addicted controls. Examples of stressors that may induce reinstatement include emotions of fear, sadness, or anger, a physical stressor such as a footshock or elevated sound level, or a social event. Drug-priming is exposing the abstinent user to the addictive substances, which will induce reinstatement of the drug-seeking behavior and drug self-administration. Stimuli that have a pre-existing association with a given drug or with use of that drug can trigger both craving and reinstatement. These cues include any items, places, or people associated with the drug.

== Treatment ==
Relapse treatment is somewhat of a misnomer because relapse itself is a treatment failure; however there exist three main approaches that are currently used to reduce the likelihood of drug relapse. These include pharmacotherapy, cognitive behavioral techniques, and contingency management. The main goals of treating substance dependence and preventing relapse are to identify the needs that were previously met by use of the drug and to develop the skills needed to meet those needs in an alternative way.

=== Pharmacotherapy ===
Related article: Drug rehabilitation

Various medications are used to stabilize an addicted user, reduce the initial drug use, and prevent reinstatement of the drug. Medications can normalize the long-term changes that occur in the brain and nervous system as a result of prolonged drug use. This method of therapy is complex and multi-faceted because the brain target for the desire to use the drug may be different from the target induced by the drug itself. The availability of various neurotransmitter receptors, such as the dopamine receptor D2, and changes in the medial prefrontal cortex are prominent targets for pharmacotherapy to prevent relapse because they are heavily linked to drug-induced, stress-induced, and cue-induced relapse. Receptor recovery can be upregulated by administration of receptor antagonists, while pharmacotherapeutic treatments for neruoadaptations in the medial prefrontal cortex are still relatively ineffective due to lacking knowledge of these adaptations on the molecular and cellular level.

=== Cognitive behavioral techniques ===
The various behavioral approaches to treating relapse focus on the precursors and consequences of drug-taking and reinstatement. Cognitive-behavioral techniques (CBT) incorporate Pavlovian conditioning and operant conditioning, characterized by positive reinforcement and negative reinforcement, in order to alter the cognitions, thoughts, and emotions associated with drug-taking behavior. A main approach of CBT is cue exposure, during which the abstinent user is repeatedly exposed to the most salient triggers without exposure to the substance in hopes that the substance will gradually lose the ability to induce drug-seeking behavior. This approach is likely to reduce the severity of a relapse than to prevent one from occurring altogether. Another method teaches addicts basic coping mechanisms to avoid using the illicit drug. It is important to address any deficits in coping skills, to identify the needs that likely induce drug-seeking, and to develop another way to meet them.

==== Relapse prevention ====
Relapse prevention attempts to group the factors that contribute to relapse into two broad categories: immediate determinants and covert antecedents. Immediate determinants are the environmental and emotional situations that are associated with relapse, including high-risk situations that threaten an individual’s sense of control, coping strategies, and outcome expectancies. Covert antecedents, which are less obvious factors influencing relapse, include lifestyle factors such as stress level and balance, and urges and cravings. The relapse prevention model teaches addicts to anticipate relapse by recognizing and coping with various immediate determinants and covert antecedents. The RP model shows the greatest success with treatment of alcoholism but it has not been proven superior to other treatment options. Relapse may also be more likely to occur during certain times, such as the holiday season when stress levels are typically higher. So, emphasizing relapse prevention strategies during these times is ideal.

=== Contingency management ===
In contrast to the behavioral approaches above, contingency management concentrates on the consequences of drug use as opposed to its precursors. Addict behavior is reinforced, by reward or punishment, based on ability to remain abstinent. A common example of contingency management is a token or voucher system, in which abstinence is rewarded with tokens or vouchers that individuals can redeem for various retail items.

== Animal models ==
There are vast ethical limitations in drug addiction research because humans cannot be allowed to self-administer drugs for the purpose of being studied. However, much can be learned about drugs and the neurobiology of drug taking by the examination of laboratory animals. Most studies are performed on rodents or non-human primates with the latter being most comparable to humans in pharmacokinetics, anatomy of the prefrontal cortex, social behavior, and life span. Other advantages to studying relapse in non-human primates include the ability of the animal to reinstate self-administration, and to learn complex behaviors in order to obtain the drug. Animal studies have shown that a reduction in negative withdrawal symptoms is not necessary to maintain drug taking in laboratory animals; the key to these studies is operant conditioning and reinforcement.

=== Protocols ===
==== Self-administration ====
To self-administer the drug of interest the animal is implanted with an intravenous catheter and seated in a primate chair equipped with a response lever. The animal is seated in a ventilated chamber and trained on a schedule of drug self-administration. In many studies the self-administration task begins with presentation of a stimulus light (located near the response panel) that may change colors or turn off upon completion of the operant task. The change in visual stimulus is accompanied by an injection of the given drug through the implanted catheter. This schedule is maintained until the animals learn the task.

==== Extinction ====
Extinction in non-human primates is analogous, with some limitations, to abstinence in humans. In order to extinguish drug-seeking behavior the drug is substituted with a saline solution. When the animal performs the task it has been trained to perform it is no longer reinforced with an injection of the drug. The visual stimulus associated with the drug and completion of the task is also removed. The extinction sessions are continued until the animal ceases the drug-seeking behavior by pressing the lever.

==== Reinstatement ====
After the animal’s drug-seeking behavior is extinguished, a stimulus is presented to promote the reinstatement of that same drug-seeking behavior (i.e., relapse). For example, if the animal receives an injection of the drug in question it will likely begin working on the operant task for which it was previously reinforced. The stimulus may be the drug itself, the visual stimulus that was initially paired with the drug intake, or a stressor such as an acoustic startle or foot shock. However, the stimulus used to trigger reinstatement can influence the psychological processes involved.

==== Neuroimaging ====
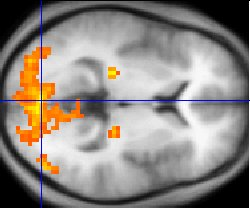
A transverse segment fMRI scan showing activated regions in orange.

Neuroimaging has contributed to the identification of the neural components involved in drug reinstatement as well as drug-taking determinants such as the pharmokinetics, neurochemistry, and dose of the drug. The neuroimaging techniques used in non-human primates include positron emission tomography (PET), which uses radiolabeled ligand tracers to measure neurochemistry in vivo and single-photon emission computed tomography (SPECT). Functional magnetic resonance imaging (fMRI) is widely used in human subjects because it has much higher resolution and eliminates exposure to radiation.

=== Limitations ===
Although the reinstatement protocols are used frequently in laboratory settings there are some limitations to the validity of the procedures as a model of craving and relapse in humans. The primary limiting factor is that in humans, relapse rarely follows the strict extinction of drug-seeking behavior. Additionally, human self-reports show that drug-associated stimuli play a lesser role in craving in humans than in the laboratory models. The validity of the model can be examined in three ways: formal equivalence, correlational models, and functional equivalence. There is moderate formal equivalence, or face validity, meaning that the model somewhat resembles relapse as it occurs outside of the laboratory setting; however, there is little face validity for the procedures as a model of craving. The predictive validity, which is assessed by correlational models, has yet to be determined for the procedures. There is sound functional equivalence for the model, which suggests that relapse in the laboratory is reasonably similar to that in nature. Further research into other manipulations or reinforcements that could limit drug-taking in non-human primates would be extremely beneficial to the field.

== Differences between sexes ==
There exists a higher rate of relapse, shorter periods of abstinence, and higher responsiveness to drug-related cues in women as compared to men. One study suggests that the ovarian hormones, estradiol and progesterone, that exist in females at fluctuating levels throughout the menstrual cycle (or estrous cycle in rodents), play a significant role in drug-primed relapse. There is a marked increase in progesterone levels and a decrease in estradiol levels during the luteal phase. Anxiety, irritability, and depression, three symptoms of both withdrawal and the human menstrual cycle, are most severe in the luteal phase. Symptoms of withdrawal not associated with the cycle, such as hunger, are also enhanced during the luteal phase, which suggests the role of estradiol and progesterone in enhancing symptoms above the naturally occurring level of the menstrual cycle. The symptoms of craving also increase during the luteal phase in humans (the opposite result occurs in female subjects with cocaine addiction suggesting that cyclic changes may be specific for different addictive substances). Further, the drug-primed response is decreased during the luteal phase suggesting a time in the cycle during which the urge to continue use may be reduced. These findings implicate a cyclic, hormone-based timing for quitting an addictive substance and preparing for magnified symptoms of withdrawal or susceptibility to relapse.

== See also ==
- Substance use disorder
- National Institute on Drug Abuse
