= List of MeSH codes (D13) =

List of medical subject headings and corresponding terminology

The following is a partial list of the "D" codes for Medical Subject Headings (MeSH), as defined by the United States National Library of Medicine (NLM).

This list continues the information at List of MeSH codes (D12.776). Codes following these are found at List of MeSH codes (D20). For other MeSH codes, see List of MeSH codes.

The source for this content is the set of MeSH Browser from the NLM.

== MeSH D13 – nucleic acids, nucleotides, and nucleosides ==
=== MeSH D13.150 – antisense elements (genetics) ===
==== MeSH D13.150.200 – DNA, antisense ====
- MeSH D13.150.200.640 – oligodeoxyribonucleotides, antisense

==== MeSH D13.150.480 – oligonucleotides, antisense ====
- MeSH D13.150.480.640 – oligodeoxyribonucleotides, antisense
- MeSH D13.150.480.645 – oligoribonucleotides, antisense

==== MeSH D13.150.650 – rna, antisense ====
- MeSH D13.150.650.319 – micrornas
- MeSH D13.150.650.319.500 – circulating microrna
- MeSH D13.150.650.640 – oligoribonucleotides, antisense
- MeSH D13.150.650.700 – rna, small interfering
- MeSH D13.150.650.700.500 – piwi-interacting rna

=== MeSH D13.444 – nucleic acids ===
==== MeSH D13.444.154 – cell-free nucleic acids ====
- MeSH D13.444.154.250 – circulating microrna
- MeSH D13.444.154.500 – circulating tumor DNA

==== MeSH D13.444.308 – DNA ====
- MeSH D13.444.308.065 – DNA, ancient
- MeSH D13.444.308.130 – DNA, a-form
- MeSH D13.444.308.135 – DNA adducts
- MeSH D13.444.308.148 – DNA, algal
- MeSH D13.444.308.150 – DNA, antisense
- MeSH D13.444.308.150.640 – oligodeoxyribonucleotides, antisense
- MeSH D13.444.308.180 – DNA, archaeal
- MeSH D13.444.308.196 – DNA, b-form
- MeSH D13.444.308.212 – DNA, bacterial
- MeSH D13.444.308.227 – DNA, c-form
- MeSH D13.444.308.243 – DNA, catalytic
- MeSH D13.444.308.283 – DNA, circular
- MeSH D13.444.308.283.084 – DNA, catenated
- MeSH D13.444.308.283.170 – DNA, chloroplast
- MeSH D13.444.308.283.225 – DNA, mitochondrial
- MeSH D13.444.308.283.225.200 – DNA, kinetoplast
- MeSH D13.444.308.283.250 – DNA, superhelical
- MeSH D13.444.308.291 – DNA, concatenated
- MeSH D13.444.308.295 – DNA, cruciform
- MeSH D13.444.308.300 – DNA, fungal
- MeSH D13.444.308.315 – DNA, helminth
- MeSH D13.444.308.324 – DNA, intergenic
- MeSH D13.444.308.324.230 – DNA, ribosomal spacer
- MeSH D13.444.308.425 – DNA, neoplasm
- MeSH D13.444.308.425.500 – circulating tumor DNA
- MeSH D13.444.308.435 – DNA, plant
- MeSH D13.444.308.435.275 – DNA, chloroplast
- MeSH D13.444.308.442 – DNA, protozoan
- MeSH D13.444.308.442.200 – DNA, kinetoplast
- MeSH D13.444.308.460 – DNA, recombinant
- MeSH D13.444.308.475 – DNA, ribosomal
- MeSH D13.444.308.475.230 – DNA, ribosomal spacer
- MeSH D13.444.308.480 – DNA, satellite
- MeSH D13.444.308.497 – DNA, single-stranded
- MeSH D13.444.308.497.220 – DNA, complementary
- MeSH D13.444.308.520 – DNA transposable elements
- MeSH D13.444.308.568 – DNA, viral
- MeSH D13.444.308.574 – DNA, z-form
- MeSH D13.444.308.577 – DNA, environmental
- MeSH D13.444.308.579 – extrachromosomal DNA
- MeSH D13.444.308.580 – isochores
- MeSH D13.444.308.760 – retroelements

==== MeSH D13.444.600 – nucleic acid probes ====
- MeSH D13.444.600.150 – antisense elements (genetics)
- MeSH D13.444.600.150.200 – DNA, antisense
- MeSH D13.444.600.150.200.640 – oligodeoxyribonucleotides, antisense
- MeSH D13.444.600.150.640 – oligonucleotides, antisense
- MeSH D13.444.600.150.640.640 – oligodeoxyribonucleotides, antisense
- MeSH D13.444.600.150.640.645 – oligoribonucleotides, antisense
- MeSH D13.444.600.150.760 – rna, antisense
- MeSH D13.444.600.150.760.640 – oligoribonucleotides, antisense
- MeSH D13.444.600.223 – DNA probes
- MeSH D13.444.600.223.500 – DNA, complementary
- MeSH D13.444.600.223.550 – DNA probes, hla
- MeSH D13.444.600.223.555 – DNA probes, hpv
- MeSH D13.444.600.601 – oligonucleotide probes
- MeSH D13.444.600.723 – rna probes
- MeSH D13.444.600.723.480 – rna, complementary

==== MeSH D13.444.735 – rna ====
- MeSH D13.444.735.032 – rna, circular
- MeSH D13.444.735.064 – rna isoforms
- MeSH D13.444.735.130 – rna, algal
- MeSH D13.444.735.150 – rna, antisense
- MeSH D13.444.735.150.319 – micrornas
- MeSH D13.444.735.150.319.500 – circulating microrna
- MeSH D13.444.735.150.640 – oligoribonucleotides, antisense
- MeSH D13.444.735.150.700 – rna, small interfering
- MeSH D13.444.735.150.700.500 – piwi-interacting rna
- MeSH D13.444.735.300 – rna, archaeal
- MeSH D13.444.735.473 – rna, bacterial
- MeSH D13.444.735.477 – rna, competitive endogenous
- MeSH D13.444.735.480 – rna, complementary
- MeSH D13.444.735.490 – rna, double-stranded
- MeSH D13.444.735.500 – rna, fungal
- MeSH D13.444.735.520 – rna, helminth
- MeSH D13.444.735.544 – rna, messenger
- MeSH D13.444.735.544.355 – codon
- MeSH D13.444.735.544.355.225 – codon, initiator
- MeSH D13.444.735.544.355.250 – codon, terminator
- MeSH D13.444.735.544.355.250.235 – codon, nonsense
- MeSH D13.444.735.544.427 – riboswitch
- MeSH D13.444.735.544.500 – rna caps
- MeSH D13.444.735.544.500.710 – rna cap analogs
- MeSH D13.444.735.544.527 – rna, messenger, stored
- MeSH D13.444.735.544.550 – rna splice sites
- MeSH D13.444.735.544.713 – subgenomic rna
- MeSH D13.444.735.544.875 – untranslated regions
- MeSH D13.444.735.544.875.880 – 3' untranslated regions
- MeSH D13.444.735.544.875.885 – 5' untranslated regions
- MeSH D13.444.735.580 – rna, mitochondrial
- MeSH D13.444.735.615 – rna, neoplasm
- MeSH D13.444.735.628 – rna, nuclear
- MeSH D13.444.735.628.806 – rna, heterogeneous nuclear
- MeSH D13.444.735.628.818 – rna, small nuclear
- MeSH D13.444.735.628.818.800 – rna, small nucleolar
- MeSH D13.444.735.635 – rna, plant
- MeSH D13.444.735.635.575 – rna, chloroplast
- MeSH D13.444.735.640 – rna precursors
- MeSH D13.444.735.650 – rna, protozoan
- MeSH D13.444.735.686 – rna, ribosomal
- MeSH D13.444.735.686.650 – rna, ribosomal, 5s
- MeSH D13.444.735.686.660 – rna, ribosomal, 5.8s
- MeSH D13.444.735.686.670 – rna, ribosomal, 16s
- MeSH D13.444.735.686.675 – rna, ribosomal, 18s
- MeSH D13.444.735.686.680 – rna, ribosomal, 23s
- MeSH D13.444.735.686.690 – rna, ribosomal, 28s
- MeSH D13.444.735.686.845 – rna, ribosomal, self-splicing
- MeSH D13.444.735.721 – rna, satellite
- MeSH D13.444.735.721.250 – cucumber mosaic virus satellite
- MeSH D13.444.735.757 – rna, transfer
- MeSH D13.444.735.757.286 – anticodon
- MeSH D13.444.735.757.700 – rna, transfer, amino acid-specific
- MeSH D13.444.735.757.700.050 – rna, transfer, ala
- MeSH D13.444.735.757.700.075 – rna, transfer, arg
- MeSH D13.444.735.757.700.085 – rna, transfer, asn
- MeSH D13.444.735.757.700.090 – rna, transfer, asp
- MeSH D13.444.735.757.700.200 – rna, transfer, cys
- MeSH D13.444.735.757.700.400 – rna, transfer, gln
- MeSH D13.444.735.757.700.410 – rna, transfer, glu
- MeSH D13.444.735.757.700.420 – rna, transfer, gly
- MeSH D13.444.735.757.700.450 – rna, transfer, his
- MeSH D13.444.735.757.700.480 – rna, transfer, ile
- MeSH D13.444.735.757.700.500 – rna, transfer, leu
- MeSH D13.444.735.757.700.510 – rna, transfer, lys
- MeSH D13.444.735.757.700.525 – rna, transfer, met
- MeSH D13.444.735.757.700.650 – rna, transfer, phe
- MeSH D13.444.735.757.700.660 – rna, transfer, pro
- MeSH D13.444.735.757.700.700 – rna, transfer, ser
- MeSH D13.444.735.757.700.725 – rna, transfer, thr
- MeSH D13.444.735.757.700.740 – rna, transfer, trp
- MeSH D13.444.735.757.700.750 – rna, transfer, tyr
- MeSH D13.444.735.757.700.900 – rna, transfer, val
- MeSH D13.444.735.757.715 – rna, transfer, amino acyl
- MeSH D13.444.735.790 – rna, untranslated
- MeSH D13.444.735.790.100 – enhancer rnas
- MeSH D13.444.735.790.199 – rna, catalytic
- MeSH D13.444.735.790.375 – rna, long noncoding
- MeSH D13.444.735.790.552 – rna, small untranslated
- MeSH D13.444.735.790.552.500 – micrornas
- MeSH D13.444.735.790.552.500.500 – circulating microrna
- MeSH D13.444.735.790.552.563 – rna, guide, crispr-cas systems
- MeSH D13.444.735.790.552.625 – rna, guide, kinetoplastida
- MeSH D13.444.735.790.552.750 – rna, small cytoplasmic
- MeSH D13.444.735.790.552.875 – rna, small interfering
- MeSH D13.444.735.790.552.875.500 – piwi-interacting rna
- MeSH D13.444.735.790.552.937 – rna, small nuclear
- MeSH D13.444.735.790.552.937.800 – rna, small nucleolar
- MeSH D13.444.735.790.552.968 – rna, spliced leader
- MeSH D13.444.735.790.878 – untranslated regions
- MeSH D13.444.735.790.878.880 – 3' untranslated regions
- MeSH D13.444.735.790.878.885 – 5' untranslated regions
- MeSH D13.444.735.790.878.942 – regulatory sequences, ribonucleic acid
- MeSH D13.444.735.790.878.942.250 – internal ribosome entry sites
- MeSH D13.444.735.790.878.942.500 – riboswitch
- MeSH D13.444.735.828 – rna, viral
- MeSH D13.444.735.828.500 – subgenomic rna
- MeSH D13.444.735.829 – rna, z-form

=== MeSH D13.570 – nucleosides ===
==== MeSH D13.570.065 – arabinonucleosides ====
- MeSH D13.570.065.090 – arabinofuranosyluracil
- MeSH D13.570.065.195 – clofarabine
- MeSH D13.570.065.300 – cytarabine
- MeSH D13.570.065.300.050 – ancitabine
- MeSH D13.570.065.950 – vidarabine

==== MeSH D13.570.230 – deoxyribonucleosides ====
- MeSH D13.570.230.229 – deoxyadenosines
- MeSH D13.570.230.229.001 – abacavir
- MeSH D13.570.230.229.075 – cladribine
- MeSH D13.570.230.229.105 – dideoxyadenosine
- MeSH D13.570.230.229.650 – puromycin aminonucleoside
- MeSH D13.570.230.329 – deoxycytidine
- MeSH D13.570.230.329.100 – bromodeoxycytidine
- MeSH D13.570.230.329.313 – capecitabine
- MeSH D13.570.230.329.525 – emtricitabine
- MeSH D13.570.230.329.525.250 – elvitegravir, cobicistat, emtricitabine, tenofovir disoproxil fumarate drug combination
- MeSH D13.570.230.329.525.500 – emtricitabine, tenofovir disoproxil fumarate drug combination
- MeSH D13.570.230.329.950 – zalcitabine
- MeSH D13.570.230.329.950.500 – lamivudine
- MeSH D13.570.230.360 – deoxyguanosine
- MeSH D13.570.230.360.500 – 8-hydroxy-2'-deoxyguanosine
- MeSH D13.570.230.430 – deoxyuridine
- MeSH D13.570.230.430.196 – bromodeoxyuridine
- MeSH D13.570.230.430.432 – floxuridine
- MeSH D13.570.230.430.609 – idoxuridine
- MeSH D13.570.230.500 – dideoxynucleosides
- MeSH D13.570.230.500.090 – didanosine
- MeSH D13.570.230.500.105 – dideoxyadenosine
- MeSH D13.570.230.500.850 – stavudine
- MeSH D13.570.230.500.925 – zalcitabine
- MeSH D13.570.230.500.925.500 – lamivudine
- MeSH D13.570.230.500.950 – zidovudine
- MeSH D13.570.230.677 – pentostatin
- MeSH D13.570.230.855 – thymidine
- MeSH D13.570.230.855.875 – stavudine
- MeSH D13.570.230.855.888 – telbivudine
- MeSH D13.570.230.855.900 – trifluridine
- MeSH D13.570.230.855.950 – zidovudine

==== MeSH D13.570.583 – purine nucleosides ====
- MeSH D13.570.583.138 – adenosine
- MeSH D13.570.583.138.025 – adenosine-5'-(n-ethylcarboxamide)
- MeSH D13.570.583.138.240 – s-adenosylhomocysteine
- MeSH D13.570.583.138.264 – s-adenosylmethionine
- MeSH D13.570.583.138.300 – 2-chloroadenosine
- MeSH D13.570.583.138.300.200 – cladribine
- MeSH D13.570.583.138.325 – deoxyadenosines
- MeSH D13.570.583.138.325.001 – abacavir
- MeSH D13.570.583.138.325.075 – cladribine
- MeSH D13.570.583.138.325.105 – dideoxyadenosine
- MeSH D13.570.583.138.325.800 – puromycin aminonucleoside
- MeSH D13.570.583.138.500 – isopentenyladenosine
- MeSH D13.570.583.138.630 – phenylisopropyladenosine
- MeSH D13.570.583.138.711 – puromycin
- MeSH D13.570.583.138.711.650 – puromycin aminonucleoside
- MeSH D13.570.583.138.806 – ticagrelor
- MeSH D13.570.583.138.900 – vidarabine
- MeSH D13.570.583.454 – guanosine
- MeSH D13.570.583.454.240 – deoxyguanosine
- MeSH D13.570.583.454.240.500 – 8-hydroxy-2'-deoxyguanosine
- MeSH D13.570.583.454.500 – nucleoside q
- MeSH D13.570.583.616 – inosine
- MeSH D13.570.583.616.130 – didanosine
- MeSH D13.570.583.616.450 – inosine pranobex
- MeSH D13.570.583.616.900 – thioinosine
- MeSH D13.570.583.616.900.500 – methylthioinosine
- MeSH D13.570.583.910 – tubercidin

==== MeSH D13.570.685 – pyrimidine nucleosides ====
- MeSH D13.570.685.245 – cytidine
- MeSH D13.570.685.245.217 – azacitidine
- MeSH D13.570.685.245.217.500 – decitabine
- MeSH D13.570.685.245.453 – cytarabine
- MeSH D13.570.685.245.453.050 – ancitabine
- MeSH D13.570.685.245.500 – deoxycytidine
- MeSH D13.570.685.245.500.250 – bromodeoxycytidine
- MeSH D13.570.685.245.500.425 – capecitabine
- MeSH D13.570.685.245.500.600 – emtricitabine
- MeSH D13.570.685.245.500.600.250 – elvitegravir, cobicistat, emtricitabine, tenofovir disoproxil fumarate drug combination
- MeSH D13.570.685.245.500.600.500 – emtricitabine, tenofovir disoproxil fumarate drug combination
- MeSH D13.570.685.245.500.950 – zalcitabine
- MeSH D13.570.685.245.500.950.500 – lamivudine
- MeSH D13.570.685.350 – formycins
- MeSH D13.570.685.350.200 – coformycin
- MeSH D13.570.685.350.200.700 – pentostatin
- MeSH D13.570.685.705 – thymidine
- MeSH D13.570.685.705.875 – stavudine
- MeSH D13.570.685.705.888 – telbivudine
- MeSH D13.570.685.705.900 – trifluridine
- MeSH D13.570.685.705.950 – zidovudine
- MeSH D13.570.685.725 – tunicamycin
- MeSH D13.570.685.852 – uridine
- MeSH D13.570.685.852.150 – arabinofuranosyluracil
- MeSH D13.570.685.852.176 – azauridine
- MeSH D13.570.685.852.250 – 3-deazauridine
- MeSH D13.570.685.852.300 – deoxyuridine
- MeSH D13.570.685.852.300.150 – bromodeoxyuridine
- MeSH D13.570.685.852.300.350 – floxuridine
- MeSH D13.570.685.852.300.400 – idoxuridine
- MeSH D13.570.685.852.628 – pseudouridine
- MeSH D13.570.685.852.800 – tetrahydrouridine
- MeSH D13.570.685.852.829 – thiouridine

==== MeSH D13.570.800 – ribonucleosides ====
- MeSH D13.570.800.096 – adenosine
- MeSH D13.570.800.096.250 – adenosine-5'-(n-ethylcarboxamide)
- MeSH D13.570.800.096.262 – s-adenosylhomocysteine
- MeSH D13.570.800.096.264 – s-adenosylmethionine
- MeSH D13.570.800.096.300 – 2-chloroadenosine
- MeSH D13.570.800.096.300.200 – cladribine
- MeSH D13.570.800.096.500 – isopentenyladenosine
- MeSH D13.570.800.096.630 – phenylisopropyladenosine
- MeSH D13.570.800.096.815 – ticagrelor
- MeSH D13.570.800.286 – cytidine
- MeSH D13.570.800.286.300 – azacitidine
- MeSH D13.570.800.286.300.500 – decitabine
- MeSH D13.570.800.330 – dichlororibofuranosylbenzimidazole
- MeSH D13.570.800.410 – formycins
- MeSH D13.570.800.410.200 – coformycin
- MeSH D13.570.800.453 – guanosine
- MeSH D13.570.800.453.500 – nucleoside q
- MeSH D13.570.800.573 – inosine
- MeSH D13.570.800.573.130 – didanosine
- MeSH D13.570.800.573.450 – inosine pranobex
- MeSH D13.570.800.573.900 – thioinosine
- MeSH D13.570.800.573.900.500 – methylthioinosine
- MeSH D13.570.800.790 – ribavirin
- MeSH D13.570.800.810 – showdomycin
- MeSH D13.570.800.840 – toyocamycin
- MeSH D13.570.800.850 – tubercidin
- MeSH D13.570.800.892 – uridine
- MeSH D13.570.800.892.176 – azauridine
- MeSH D13.570.800.892.250 – 3-deazauridine
- MeSH D13.570.800.892.628 – pseudouridine
- MeSH D13.570.800.892.800 – tetrahydrouridine
- MeSH D13.570.800.892.829 – thiouridine

==== MeSH D13.570.900 – thionucleosides ====
- MeSH D13.570.900.111 – azathioprine
- MeSH D13.570.900.800 – thioinosine
- MeSH D13.570.900.800.500 – methylthioinosine
- MeSH D13.570.900.829 – thiouridine

=== MeSH D13.695 – nucleotides ===
==== MeSH D13.695.065 – arabinonucleotides ====
- MeSH D13.695.065.200 – arabinofuranosylcytosine triphosphate
- MeSH D13.695.065.900 – vidarabine phosphate

==== MeSH D13.695.201 – deoxyribonucleotides ====
- MeSH D13.695.201.100 – deoxyadenine nucleotides
- MeSH D13.695.201.150 – deoxycytosine nucleotides
- MeSH D13.695.201.150.200 – deoxycytidine monophosphate
- MeSH D13.695.201.175 – deoxyguanine nucleotides
- MeSH D13.695.201.200 – deoxyuracil nucleotides
- MeSH D13.695.201.200.270 – fluorodeoxyuridylate
- MeSH D13.695.201.486 – nucleoside diphosphate sugars
- MeSH D13.695.201.789 – thymine nucleotides
- MeSH D13.695.201.789.788 – thymidine monophosphate

==== MeSH D13.695.462 – nucleotides, cyclic ====
- MeSH D13.695.462.200 – cyclic amp
- MeSH D13.695.462.200.225 – 8-bromo cyclic adenosine monophosphate
- MeSH D13.695.462.200.250 – bucladesine
- MeSH D13.695.462.250 – cyclic cmp
- MeSH D13.695.462.275 – cyclic gmp
- MeSH D13.695.462.275.325 – dibutyryl cyclic gmp
- MeSH D13.695.462.300 – cyclic imp

==== MeSH D13.695.578 – polynucleotides ====
- MeSH D13.695.578.424 – oligonucleotides
- MeSH D13.695.578.424.112 – antagomirs
- MeSH D13.695.578.424.224 – aptamers, nucleotide
- MeSH D13.695.578.424.337 – morpholinos
- MeSH D13.695.578.424.450 – oligodeoxyribonucleotides
- MeSH D13.695.578.424.450.275 – DNA primers
- MeSH D13.695.578.424.480 – oligonucleotides, antisense
- MeSH D13.695.578.424.480.640 – oligodeoxyribonucleotides, antisense
- MeSH D13.695.578.424.480.645 – oligoribonucleotides, antisense
- MeSH D13.695.578.424.500 – oligoribonucleotides
- MeSH D13.695.578.424.550 – peptide nucleic acids
- MeSH D13.695.578.424.575 – phosphorothioate oligonucleotides
- MeSH D13.695.578.424.600 – pyrimidine dimers
- MeSH D13.695.578.500 – polydeoxyribonucleotides
- MeSH D13.695.578.500.050 – apurinic acid
- MeSH D13.695.578.500.300 – poly da-dt
- MeSH D13.695.578.500.600 – poly t
- MeSH D13.695.578.550 – polyribonucleotides
- MeSH D13.695.578.550.050 – apurinic acid
- MeSH D13.695.578.550.500 – poly a
- MeSH D13.695.578.550.500.510 – poly a-u
- MeSH D13.695.578.550.530 – poly adenosine diphosphate ribose
- MeSH D13.695.578.550.560 – poly c
- MeSH D13.695.578.550.560.600 – poly i-c
- MeSH D13.695.578.550.600 – poly g
- MeSH D13.695.578.550.650 – poly i
- MeSH D13.695.578.550.650.600 – poly i-c
- MeSH D13.695.578.550.750 – poly u
- MeSH D13.695.578.550.750.510 – poly a-u

==== MeSH D13.695.667 – purine nucleotides ====
- MeSH D13.695.667.138 – adenine nucleotides
- MeSH D13.695.667.138.124 – adenosine diphosphate
- MeSH D13.695.667.138.124.070 – adenosine diphosphate sugars
- MeSH D13.695.667.138.124.070.075 – adenosine diphosphate glucose
- MeSH D13.695.667.138.124.070.125 – adenosine diphosphate ribose
- MeSH D13.695.667.138.124.070.125.040 – o-acetyl-adp-ribose
- MeSH D13.695.667.138.124.070.125.195 – cyclic adp-ribose
- MeSH D13.695.667.138.180 – adenosine monophosphate
- MeSH D13.695.667.138.180.080 – adenosine phosphosulfate
- MeSH D13.695.667.138.236 – adenosine triphosphate
- MeSH D13.695.667.138.236.050 – adenylyl imidodiphosphate
- MeSH D13.695.667.138.236.250 – ethenoadenosine triphosphate
- MeSH D13.695.667.138.309 – clofarabine
- MeSH D13.695.667.138.382 – coenzyme a
- MeSH D13.695.667.138.382.300 – acyl coenzyme a
- MeSH D13.695.667.138.382.300.020 – acetyl coenzyme a
- MeSH D13.695.667.138.382.300.500 – malonyl coenzyme a
- MeSH D13.695.667.138.382.300.700 – palmitoyl coenzyme a
- MeSH D13.695.667.138.395 – cyclic amp
- MeSH D13.695.667.138.395.225 – 8-bromo cyclic adenosine monophosphate
- MeSH D13.695.667.138.395.250 – bucladesine
- MeSH D13.695.667.138.410 – deoxyadenine nucleotides
- MeSH D13.695.667.138.506 – flavin-adenine dinucleotide
- MeSH D13.695.667.138.694 – nad
- MeSH D13.695.667.138.749 – nadp
- MeSH D13.695.667.138.850 – phosphoadenosine phosphosulfate
- MeSH D13.695.667.138.925 – vidarabine phosphate
- MeSH D13.695.667.454 – guanine nucleotides
- MeSH D13.695.667.454.160 – cyclic gmp
- MeSH D13.695.667.454.160.325 – dibutyryl cyclic gmp
- MeSH D13.695.667.454.200 – deoxyguanine nucleotides
- MeSH D13.695.667.454.340 – guanosine diphosphate
- MeSH D13.695.667.454.340.350 – guanosine diphosphate sugars
- MeSH D13.695.667.454.340.350.400 – guanosine diphosphate fucose
- MeSH D13.695.667.454.340.350.500 – guanosine diphosphate mannose
- MeSH D13.695.667.454.400 – guanosine monophosphate
- MeSH D13.695.667.454.440 – guanosine pentaphosphate
- MeSH D13.695.667.454.480 – guanosine tetraphosphate
- MeSH D13.695.667.454.504 – guanosine triphosphate
- MeSH D13.695.667.454.504.380 – guanosine 5'-o-(3-thiotriphosphate)
- MeSH D13.695.667.454.504.400 – guanylyl imidodiphosphate
- MeSH D13.695.667.454.700 – rna caps
- MeSH D13.695.667.454.700.710 – rna cap analogs
- MeSH D13.695.667.616 – inosine nucleotides
- MeSH D13.695.667.616.300 – cyclic imp
- MeSH D13.695.667.616.400 – inosine diphosphate
- MeSH D13.695.667.616.500 – inosine monophosphate
- MeSH D13.695.667.616.800 – inosine triphosphate

==== MeSH D13.695.740 – pyrimidine nucleotides ====
- MeSH D13.695.740.050 – apurinic acid
- MeSH D13.695.740.246 – cytosine nucleotides
- MeSH D13.695.740.246.050 – arabinofuranosylcytosine triphosphate
- MeSH D13.695.740.246.115 – cyclic cmp
- MeSH D13.695.740.246.150 – cytidine diphosphate
- MeSH D13.695.740.246.150.180 – cytidine diphosphate choline
- MeSH D13.695.740.246.150.210 – cytidine diphosphate diglycerides
- MeSH D13.695.740.246.370 – cytidine monophosphate
- MeSH D13.695.740.246.370.250 – cytidine monophosphate n-acetylneuraminic acid
- MeSH D13.695.740.246.400 – cytidine triphosphate
- MeSH D13.695.740.246.425 – deoxycytosine nucleotides
- MeSH D13.695.740.246.425.300 – deoxycytidine monophosphate
- MeSH D13.695.740.600 – pyrimidine dimers
- MeSH D13.695.740.706 – thymine nucleotides
- MeSH D13.695.740.706.788 – thymidine monophosphate
- MeSH D13.695.740.850 – uracil nucleotides
- MeSH D13.695.740.850.210 – deoxyuracil nucleotides
- MeSH D13.695.740.850.210.200 – fluorodeoxyuridylate
- MeSH D13.695.740.850.600 – uridine diphosphate
- MeSH D13.695.740.850.600.677 – uridine diphosphate sugars
- MeSH D13.695.740.850.600.677.100 – uridine diphosphate n-acetylgalactosamine
- MeSH D13.695.740.850.600.677.120 – uridine diphosphate n-acetylglucosamine
- MeSH D13.695.740.850.600.677.150 – uridine diphosphate n-acetylmuramic acid
- MeSH D13.695.740.850.600.677.300 – uridine diphosphate galactose
- MeSH D13.695.740.850.600.677.350 – uridine diphosphate glucose
- MeSH D13.695.740.850.600.677.375 – uridine diphosphate glucuronic acid
- MeSH D13.695.740.850.600.677.800 – uridine diphosphate xylose
- MeSH D13.695.740.850.877 – uridine monophosphate
- MeSH D13.695.740.850.877.500 – sofosbuvir
- MeSH D13.695.740.850.950 – uridine triphosphate

==== MeSH D13.695.827 – ribonucleotides ====
- MeSH D13.695.827.068 – adenine nucleotides
- MeSH D13.695.827.068.124 – adenosine diphosphate
- MeSH D13.695.827.068.124.070 – adenosine diphosphate sugars
- MeSH D13.695.827.068.124.070.075 – adenosine diphosphate glucose
- MeSH D13.695.827.068.124.070.125 – adenosine diphosphate ribose
- MeSH D13.695.827.068.124.070.125.040 – o-acetyl-adp-ribose
- MeSH D13.695.827.068.124.070.125.195 – cyclic adp-ribose
- MeSH D13.695.827.068.180 – adenosine monophosphate
- MeSH D13.695.827.068.180.080 – adenosine phosphosulfate
- MeSH D13.695.827.068.236 – adenosine triphosphate
- MeSH D13.695.827.068.236.050 – adenylyl imidodiphosphate
- MeSH D13.695.827.068.236.250 – ethenoadenosine triphosphate
- MeSH D13.695.827.068.309 – clofarabine
- MeSH D13.695.827.068.382 – coenzyme a
- MeSH D13.695.827.068.382.300 – acyl coenzyme a
- MeSH D13.695.827.068.382.300.020 – acetyl coenzyme a
- MeSH D13.695.827.068.382.300.500 – malonyl coenzyme a
- MeSH D13.695.827.068.382.300.700 – palmitoyl coenzyme a
- MeSH D13.695.827.068.395 – cyclic amp
- MeSH D13.695.827.068.395.225 – 8-bromo cyclic adenosine monophosphate
- MeSH D13.695.827.068.395.250 – bucladesine
- MeSH D13.695.827.068.506 – flavin-adenine dinucleotide
- MeSH D13.695.827.068.694 – nad
- MeSH D13.695.827.068.749 – nadp
- MeSH D13.695.827.068.850 – phosphoadenosine phosphosulfate
- MeSH D13.695.827.232 – cytosine nucleotides
- MeSH D13.695.827.232.115 – cyclic cmp
- MeSH D13.695.827.232.150 – cytidine diphosphate
- MeSH D13.695.827.232.150.180 – cytidine diphosphate choline
- MeSH D13.695.827.232.150.210 – cytidine diphosphate diglycerides
- MeSH D13.695.827.232.370 – cytidine monophosphate
- MeSH D13.695.827.232.370.250 – cytidine monophosphate n-acetylneuraminic acid
- MeSH D13.695.827.232.400 – cytidine triphosphate
- MeSH D13.695.827.349 – flavin mononucleotide
- MeSH D13.695.827.426 – guanine nucleotides
- MeSH D13.695.827.426.160 – cyclic gmp
- MeSH D13.695.827.426.160.325 – dibutyryl cyclic gmp
- MeSH D13.695.827.426.340 – guanosine diphosphate
- MeSH D13.695.827.426.340.350 – guanosine diphosphate sugars
- MeSH D13.695.827.426.340.350.400 – guanosine diphosphate fucose
- MeSH D13.695.827.426.340.350.500 – guanosine diphosphate mannose
- MeSH D13.695.827.426.400 – guanosine monophosphate
- MeSH D13.695.827.426.440 – guanosine pentaphosphate
- MeSH D13.695.827.426.480 – guanosine tetraphosphate
- MeSH D13.695.827.426.504 – guanosine triphosphate
- MeSH D13.695.827.426.504.380 – guanosine 5'-o-(3-thiotriphosphate)
- MeSH D13.695.827.426.504.400 – guanylyl imidodiphosphate
- MeSH D13.695.827.426.700 – rna caps
- MeSH D13.695.827.426.700.710 – rna cap analogs
- MeSH D13.695.827.519 – inosine nucleotides
- MeSH D13.695.827.519.300 – cyclic imp
- MeSH D13.695.827.519.400 – inosine diphosphate
- MeSH D13.695.827.519.500 – inosine monophosphate
- MeSH D13.695.827.519.800 – inosine triphosphate
- MeSH D13.695.827.648 – nicotinamide mononucleotide
- MeSH D13.695.827.708 – nucleoside diphosphate sugars
- MeSH D13.695.827.708.070 – adenosine diphosphate sugars
- MeSH D13.695.827.708.070.075 – adenosine diphosphate glucose
- MeSH D13.695.827.708.070.125 – adenosine diphosphate ribose
- MeSH D13.695.827.708.070.125.040 – o-acetyl-adp-ribose
- MeSH D13.695.827.708.070.125.195 – cyclic adp-ribose
- MeSH D13.695.827.708.070.125.600 – poly adenosine diphosphate ribose
- MeSH D13.695.827.708.260 – cytidine diphosphate diglycerides
- MeSH D13.695.827.708.400 – guanosine diphosphate sugars
- MeSH D13.695.827.708.400.410 – guanosine diphosphate fucose
- MeSH D13.695.827.708.400.500 – guanosine diphosphate mannose
- MeSH D13.695.827.708.727 – uridine diphosphate sugars
- MeSH D13.695.827.708.727.100 – uridine diphosphate n-acetylgalactosamine
- MeSH D13.695.827.708.727.120 – uridine diphosphate n-acetylglucosamine
- MeSH D13.695.827.708.727.150 – uridine diphosphate n-acetylmuramic acid
- MeSH D13.695.827.708.727.300 – uridine diphosphate galactose
- MeSH D13.695.827.708.727.350 – uridine diphosphate glucose
- MeSH D13.695.827.708.727.375 – uridine diphosphate glucuronic acid
- MeSH D13.695.827.708.727.800 – uridine diphosphate xylose
- MeSH D13.695.827.919 – uracil nucleotides
- MeSH D13.695.827.919.600 – uridine diphosphate
- MeSH D13.695.827.919.600.677 – uridine diphosphate sugars
- MeSH D13.695.827.919.600.677.100 – uridine diphosphate n-acetylgalactosamine
- MeSH D13.695.827.919.600.677.120 – uridine diphosphate n-acetylglucosamine
- MeSH D13.695.827.919.600.677.150 – uridine diphosphate n-acetylmuramic acid
- MeSH D13.695.827.919.600.677.300 – uridine diphosphate galactose
- MeSH D13.695.827.919.600.677.350 – uridine diphosphate glucose
- MeSH D13.695.827.919.600.677.375 – uridine diphosphate glucuronic acid
- MeSH D13.695.827.919.600.677.800 – uridine diphosphate xylose
- MeSH D13.695.827.919.877 – uridine monophosphate
- MeSH D13.695.827.919.877.500 – sofosbuvir
- MeSH D13.695.827.919.950 – uridine triphosphate

==== MeSH D13.695.900 – thionucleotides ====
- MeSH D13.695.900.380 – guanosine 5'-o-(3-thiotriphosphate)

The list continues at List of MeSH codes (D20).
