= Tethya rubra =

Scientific classification
- Kingdom: Animalia
- Phylum: Porifera
- Class: Demospongiae
- Order: Tethyida
- Family: Tethyidae
- Genus: Tethya
- Species: T. rubra

Binomial name
- Tethya rubra Ribeiro & Muricy, 2004

Species of sponge

Tethya rubra is a species of sea sponge belonging to the family Tethyidae. It is found in the Atlantic Ocean off the coast of Brazil.
