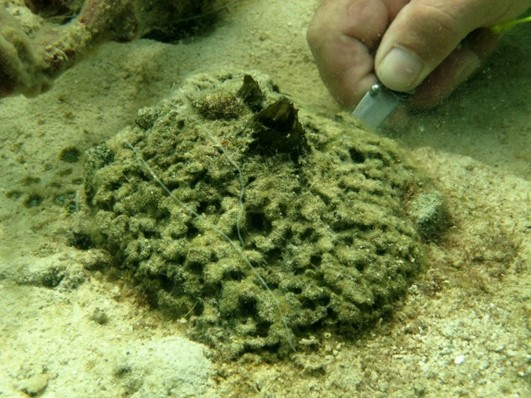

Scientific classification
- Kingdom: Animalia
- Phylum: Porifera
- Class: Demospongiae
- Order: Tethyida
- Family: Tethyidae
- Genus: Tectitethya
- Species: T. crypta

Binomial name
- Tectitethya crypta (de Laubenfels, 1949)

Synonyms
- Cryptotethya crypta de Laubenfels, 1949; Tethya crypta (de Laubenfels, 1949)

= Tectitethya crypta =

Species of sponge

Tectitethya crypta is a species of demosponge belonging to the family Tethyidae. Its classified family is characterized by fourteen different known genera, one of them being Tectitethya. It is a massive, shallow-water sponge found in the Caribbean Sea. This sponge was first discovered by Werner Bergmann in 1945 and later classified by de Laubenfels in 1949. It is located in reef areas situated on softer substrates such as sand or mud. Oftentimes, it is covered in sand and algae. This results in an appearance that is cream colored/ gray colored; however, when the animal is washed free of its sediment coverings, its body plan appears more green and gray. T. crypta is characterized by ostia peaking out of its body cavity, with the ability to abruptly open or close, changing the water flow rate through its mesohyl.

This sponge is the source of the unusual nucleosides spongothymidine and spongouridine. Research on these two chemical compounds indirectly inspired the discovery and development of the synthetic pharmaceutical drugs vidarabine, which is used as an antiviral drug, and cytarabine which is used in the treatment of leukemia and lymphoma.

== Anatomy and physiology ==
=== Body morphology ===
As described by Laubenfels, the body of this sponge is amorphous, bulky, and approximately the size of one's fist. Its dimensions are around 4 by 7 by 12 centimetres (1.6 in × 2.8 in × 4.7 in) and may be cylindrical, conical, or hemispherical in shape. More recent studies have indicated a larger range of size within this species. The outermost, visible layer of the animal can be seen to have flat tubercules, approximately 3 to 5 millimeters in diameter and a thick layer of sediment. Its actual olive pigment isn't easily visible under this layer of sand/ sediment. In clustered bundles on the surface of the animal are structures called megascleres, radiating and branching outwards. Ray tips are rounded; micrasters are seen to be 8 to 12 μm in diameter. Star spicules makeup a layer beneath its exterior skeleton. T. crypta is not characterized with a cortex.

=== Size ===
Three main developmental phases have been identified in conjunction with the sponges' localization of course sediment within its body. The small sponges are characterized with a spherical shape and possess evenly spread sediment. The medium T. crypta sponges are seen to have a conical shape with their sediment concentrated near their bottom or base. The larger sponges are seen to be irregular in shape and also have evenly distributed sediments. With each body size are different habits that each acquire. Smaller sponges are unattached and are seen to rest and roll freely. The medium sponges are also unattached; however, they still have great stability with their shape and sediment concentration. Lastly, the larger sponges are attached on their bottom-end. Typically, 67% of their body is buried in sand.

=== Movement ===
T. crypta are capable of strong body contractions and allow oscula the ability to move (open/ close) at a quick rate. In fact, this sponge is capable of closing its osculum completely, which has been proven to be a useful adaptation for an animal living in sandy environments. Ostia are about 1 millimeter in size, occurring in clusters along the flank of the sponge. The osculum, bearing a diameter of 20–25 mm (0.79–0.98 in), are seen near the top of the cone. These structures have the ability to be contracted. The ability to circulate water through bottom sediments possibly makes for a nutrient-rich and attractive environment for other organisms to live in or near the sponges.

=== Sediment organization ===
The dirty exterior of the sponge smothered in layers of algae/ sediment/ sand serves a purpose to the animal and has been shown to hold structural organization across its species. Sand that is brought into the body will be organized in patterns determined by its granulometry and sponge size. This sorting and distribution occur in the choanosome: sediments smaller than 500 μm gather in clusters (known as nuclei) while the larger particles are found to be distributed evenly through the sponge body. T. crypta sponges have been noted to favor the selection of fine sediment grains within the range of 40 to 60 μm. Additional analysis through microscopic tools has revealed high selection for allocthonous sponge spicules, radiolarians, and diatoms. Deeper analysis of incorporated sediment is needed to identify additional materials and cells that have not been identified as of now. The sand is eventually transported by a specific cell to a desired location through the use of a cellular track which facilitates sediment transport from the ectosome to the accumulated nuclei. The ontogeny of the T. crypta sponge is largely affected by this process of sediment incorporation and organization. Differentiation between smaller and larger sediments and their corresponding location has proven useful in identifying possible functioning of positioning of these particles on the surface of the sponge. Smaller, fine sediments are packed in the nuclei within the body of the sponge while the more coarse grains are located towards the base of the sponge; this localization helps in anchoring and stabilizing the sponge with the help of gravity. The sediments are involved in part with the morphogenesis of the animal. The forming of the nuclei clusters stabilizes the sponge's body, allowing the animal to alter its skeleton structure. A radial morphology is then able to change into a branched one, which further allows the animal to develop into its massive, irregular fully-formed shape.

=== Feeding ===
T. crypta are filter feeders, utilizing their choanocytes to generate an inward current and pulling in their nutrients. The course of action of filter feeding goes as follows: ostium, spongocoel, and osculum. In the middle of this route, nutrients may be absorbed and taken in by the sponge to utilize. T. crypta generally eat the following organisms: Chaetoceros, pinnulaira, striatella unipunctata, and skeleronema tropicum.

=== Reproduction ===
T. crypta reproduction may be oviparous through the use of parenchymella larvae or it may be carried out asexually (budding).

== Ecology ==
Tectitethya crypta can be found in shallow water, only about 1–20 m (3–70 ft) in depth within the Caribbean. It dwells on a soft substrate, typically substances such as muds, sands, or clays. It can geographically be located in a reef near the Florida Keys, Dry Tortugas, and north-west shores of Cuba, as well as the Florida west coast. The larger of the sponges, sizing around 1.5–10 litres (0.40–2.64 US gal) in volume are typically found attached to their substrate while the smaller sponges of this species, sizing around 0.5–1.5 litres (0.13–0.40 US gal) in volume are typically found to be unattached and resting freely on their bottom.

== Human relations ==
=== Medicine ===
Chemical structures of spongothymidine and spongouridine (top row), and the pharmaceutical drugs they indirectly inspired, vidarabine and cytarabine (bottom row)

The discovery of T. crypta allowed for the development of the first pharmaceutical drugs inspired by sponge-derived natural products. Spongothymidine and spongouridine are two nucleosides that were first isolated from T. crypta and characterized in the 1950s. These chemicals may play a role as chemical defense mechanisms and protection from prey, as T. crypta is a sessile organism not possessing an immune system. Research on these two chemical compounds indirectly inspired the discovery and development of the synthetic pharmaceutical drugs vidarabine, which is used as an antiviral drug, and cytarabine which is used in the treatment of leukemia and lymphoma.
