= Tethya meloni =

Scientific classification
- Kingdom: Animalia
- Phylum: Porifera
- Class: Demospongiae
- Order: Tethyida
- Family: Tethyidae
- Genus: Tethya
- Species: T. meloni

Binomial name
- Tethya meloni Corriero, Gadaleta & Bavestrello, 2015

Sponge species

Tethya meloni is a species of sea sponges belonging to the family Tethyidae. It was first described in 2015 by G. Corriero, F.Gadaleta and G.Bravestrello following the analysis of multiple sponge samples from the Mediterranean Sea. The researchers from the University of Genova aimed to study the species Tethya and extensively collected samples from shallow to over 100 m water depth.

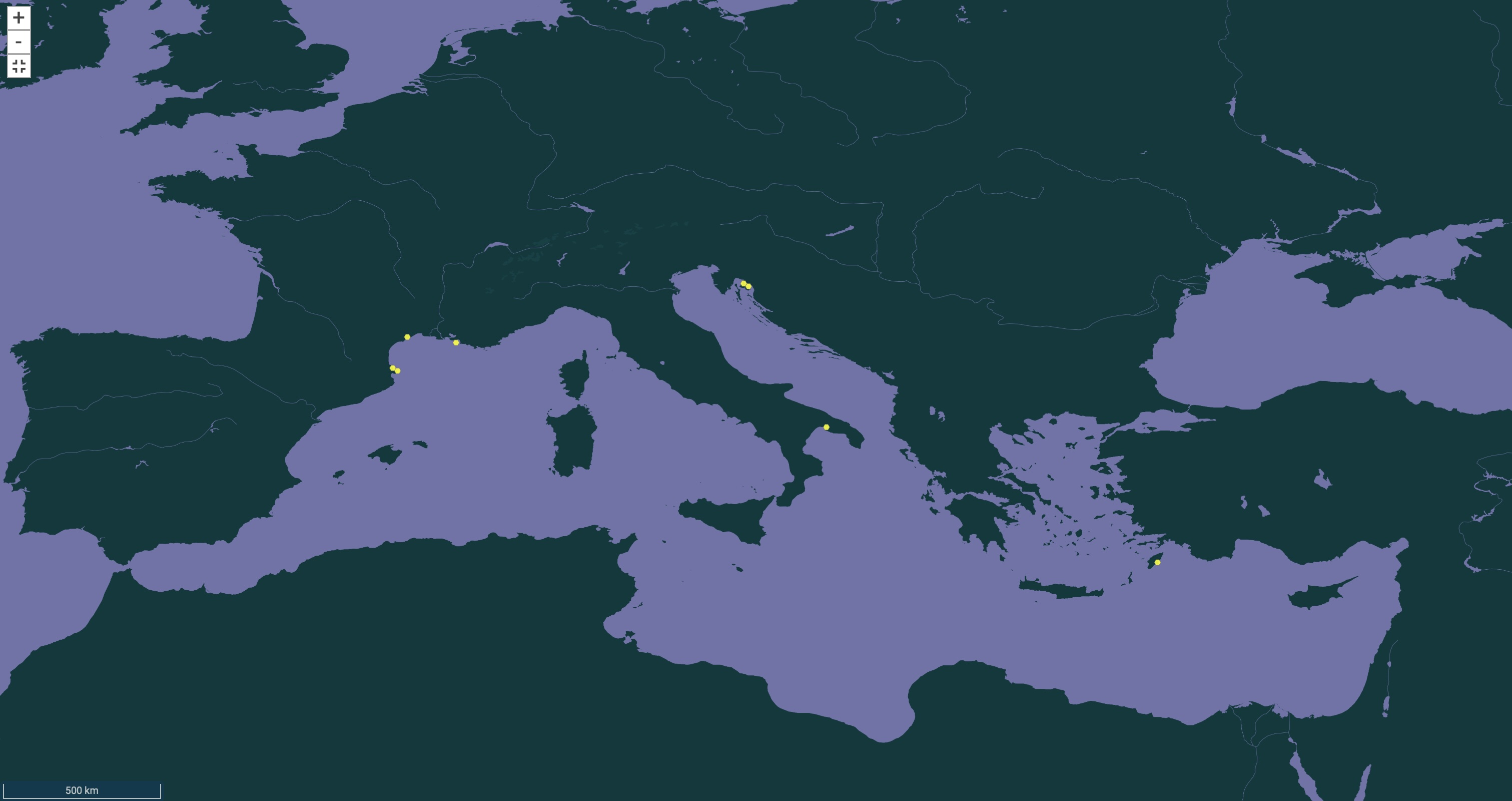
Reported occurrences of Tethya meloni are marked in yellow along the northern coast of the Mediterranean Sea. Detailed information about their habitat or liveliness can der found on naturalist.org.

Like all the members of the genus Tethya, Tethya meloni has a spherical body with flattened tubercules and ranging in diameter between 3 and 8 cm. The known distribution is concentrated along the Italian and southern French coast and is likely restricted to the Mediterranean Sea.

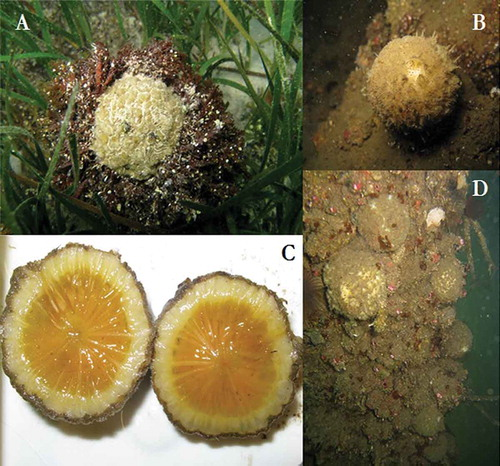
A-B, Tethya meloni in the natural habitat together with seagrass; C, isolated individum with well-differentiated cortex; D, an external surface formed by the aggregation of individual individuals

== Description ==
Tethya meloni is a species of sponge characterized by its large body size. It typically has a spherical or subspherical massive shape. The diameter ranges from 2.9 to 7.6 cm (mean 5.2 cm), making it larger than many other sponge species. It has a cream-colored body with a pale yellow surface which is characterized by flattened tubercles. The well-developed cortex is thicker than that of related species (3–5 mm, mean 4 mm). The cortex is a key feature for structural support and protection.

Spicular traits further distinguish T. meloni from fellow species of Tethya. The sponge wall is composed of oxyspherasters—star-shaped spicules—that are significantly larger than those in T. citrina, measuring 65.7–119 μm in diameter (mean: 106.5 μm) compared to 18–64.8 μm (mean: 42.9 μm) in T. citrina. Additionally, T. meloni shows a higher R/C index (ray length to center diameter) of 1–1.8 compared to T. citrina with 0.6–1.4. Together, the large and flattened tubercles, the thick cortex, and the unique spicular traits highlight the distinguishing characteristics of T. meloni within its genus.

=== Skeleton structure ===
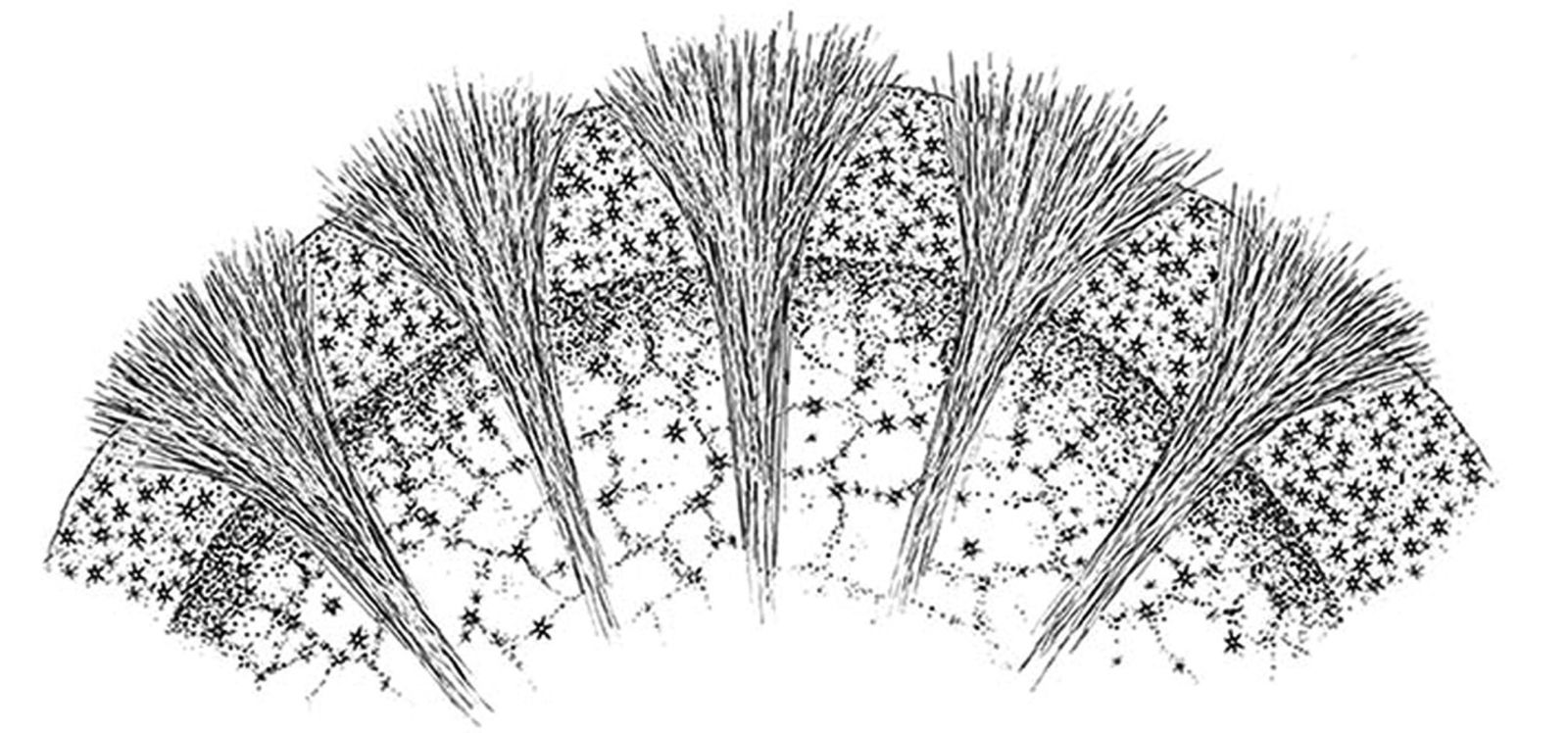
Cross section of the cell wall of Tethya meloni outlines the structures of the internal skeleton.

The main skeleton consists of bundles of strongyloxeas radiating from the center of the sponge, with additional strongyloxeas present. The strongyloxeas vary in size, measuring 730–1890 μm in length and 10–40 μm in thickness.

The megasters (oxyspherasters) are distributed throughout the entire cortex and choanosome. Their diameter ranges from 65.7 to 119 μm, with 12–16 rays that are slightly curved toward the tips and sometimes bifurcated.

Micrasters form a thin external cortical layer and are distributed throughout the sponge tissue. There are two types of micrasters: chi asters–tylasters (conical) and oxyasters (cylindrical). The diameter of micrasters varies between 13.7 and 14.9 μm in the cortex and 15–17.4 μm in the choanosome.

== Distribution and habitat ==
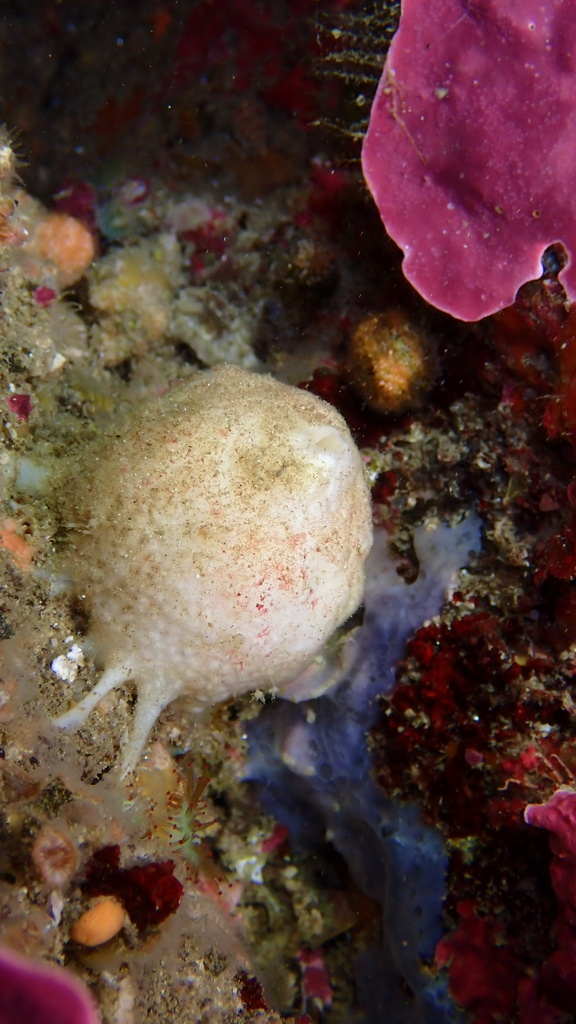
Tethyla meloni attached to substrate.

Tethya meloni is distributed throughout the Mediterranean Sea and the eastern Atlantic Ocean. It inhabits diverse environments, including vertical artificial substrates such as mussel farming pools and artificial piers, where it is shielded from direct sunlight. In these areas, the species establishes large colonies with high population densities, reaching up to about 100 specimens per square meter of substrate.

The species is also found on shaded rocky surfaces and in non-sessile form over soft seabeds. The soft seabeds are often covered by seagrass species like Cymodocea nodosa. In light-exposed environments, such as Porto Cesareo, the surface of Tethya meloni is partially covered by a thick layer of the red algae Rytiphloea tinctoria.

== Reproduction ==
The reproduction of Tethya meloni is characterized by both sexual and asexual processes. Asexual reproduction is less common but occurs primarily through budding, a process observed as both a seasonal event and a continuous activity with short seasonal decreases. This variability suggests a significant role of environmental factors, such as water temperature, on the asexual reproductive pattern. Budding involves the massive production of undifferentiated buds, which lack clear separation between cortical and choanosomal layers. However, the asexual phase is generally short and seems to play a less critical role in the overall reproduction

Sexual reproduction in T. meloni is more prominent, with strong variability in gamete production. Activity is influenced by environmental conditions, particularly the monthly water temperature trends, as recorded in the Mar Piccolo of Taranto. The species exhibits a prolonged oocyte production period, often peaking in summer or autumn. They show a moderate reproductive effort, with only a small percentage of the choanosome occupied by oocytes. Spermatogenesis, which begins shortly after the onset of oocyte production, involves a higher reproductive effort compared to oogenesis. This results in a focused use of energy during this phase. Like among other sponges, the sex ratio in T. meloni populations is strongly oriented towards females

To conclude, sexual and asexual reproductive activities can coexist, not only within the same population but also within the same specimen. This parallel reproductive strategy suggests that resource distribution between sexual and asexual reproduction does not act competitively. In one study, 20.1% of specimens exhibited elements of sexual reproduction alongside their asexual processes. These findings highlight the flexibility of T. meloni to react to environmental changes and ensure a successful reproduction.

== Use and application ==
Tethya meloni has a significant potential for applications in bioremediation and as a source of bioactive marine compounds. This makes it an attractive species for industries ranging from aquaculture to biotechnology to pharmaceuticals.

=== Bioremediation potential ===
One of the primary challenges in aquaculture is managing effluents, which often contain high concentrations of organic and inorganic pollutants, including pathogenic bacteria such as Vibrio parahaemolyticus. These contaminants originate from uneaten feed and the feces of farmed species.

Laboratory experiments have shown that Tethya meloni can effectively filter and reduce bacterial concentrations in wastewater. The demosponge exhibited an impressive retention efficiency. Within a 24-hour period, it was able to achieve bacterial removal of up to 100%.

=== Source of marine natural products ===
In addition to its filtering capabilities, Tethya meloni serves as a promising source of natural bioactive compounds. The extracts from its tissues contain a high concentration of taurine, which is a compound with diverse medicinal applications. Taurine is widely recognized for its neuroprotective properties and its potential in treating diseases such as Alzheimer's, Parkinson's, and Huntington's. Furthermore, taurine offers protective benefits across various physiological systems, including the cardiovascular, respiratory, and endocrine systems. The sponge also produces other valuable compounds, such as sterols and ceramides. These substances are of significant interest to the pharmaceutical, cosmetic, and biotechnology industries

=== Drug discovery and bioactive compound ===
Marine natural products extracted from sponges like Tethya meloni are increasingly being explored for their pharmacological properties. The phylum Porifera is known for its prolific production of pharmacologically active compounds with unique chemical structures. Among the key targets for drug discovery are matrix metalloproteinases (MMPs), particularly gelatinases A (MMP-2) and B (MMP-9). These enzymes play crucial roles in the pathogenesis of various human diseases.
