= Tethya actinia =

Scientific classification
- Kingdom: Animalia
- Phylum: Porifera
- Class: Demospongiae
- Order: Tethyida
- Family: Tethyidae
- Genus: Tethya
- Species: T. actinia

Binomial name
- Tethya actinia de Laubenfels, 1950

Species of sponge

Tethya actinia is a sea sponge belonging to the family Tethyidae.

While it is highly toxic to fish, it is known to be preyed upon by the hawksbill turtle, Eretmochelys imbricata.
