= Tethya wilhelma =

Scientific classification
- Kingdom: Animalia
- Phylum: Porifera
- Class: Demospongiae
- Order: Tethyida
- Family: Tethyidae
- Genus: Tethya
- Species: T. wilhelma

Binomial name
- Tethya wilhelma Sarà, Sarà, Nickel & Brümmer, 2001

Species of sponge

Tethya wilhelma is a species of sea sponge belonging to the family Tethyidae. Named after the Wilhelma zoological-botanical garden in Stuttgart where it was collected, this species was the subject of detailed observation in its aquarium habitat. It reproduces asexually through budding and can move its body in a process of morphological reorganization. Its origin is likely Indo-Pacific, and it shows affinities with other Indo-Pacific species like Tethya seychellensis.
