= Golf ball sponge =

Golf ball sponge may refer to several different species of sea sponges:

- Any of the species in the genus Tetillidae, found throughout the world
- Tethya aurantium, found off the southern African coast
- Tethya samaaii, the red golf ball sponge, found off the western coast of South Africa
