= Tethya leysae =

Scientific classification
- Kingdom: Animalia
- Phylum: Porifera
- Class: Demospongiae
- Order: Tethyida
- Family: Tethyidae
- Genus: Tethya
- Species: T. leysae

Binomial name
- Tethya leysae Heim & Nickel, 2010

Species of sponge

Holotype site'"`UNIQ--ref-00000008-QINU`"'

Tethya leysae is a species of sea sponge belonging to the family Tethyidae, found in the Canadian north-west Pacific.

It was first described by Heim and Nickel in 2010, from specimens collected by Sally P. Leys from a rocky bottom substrate (10 m-25 m in depth) near Ohiat Island, British Columbia in 2003 and 2006. The species epithet honours Sally P. Leys.
