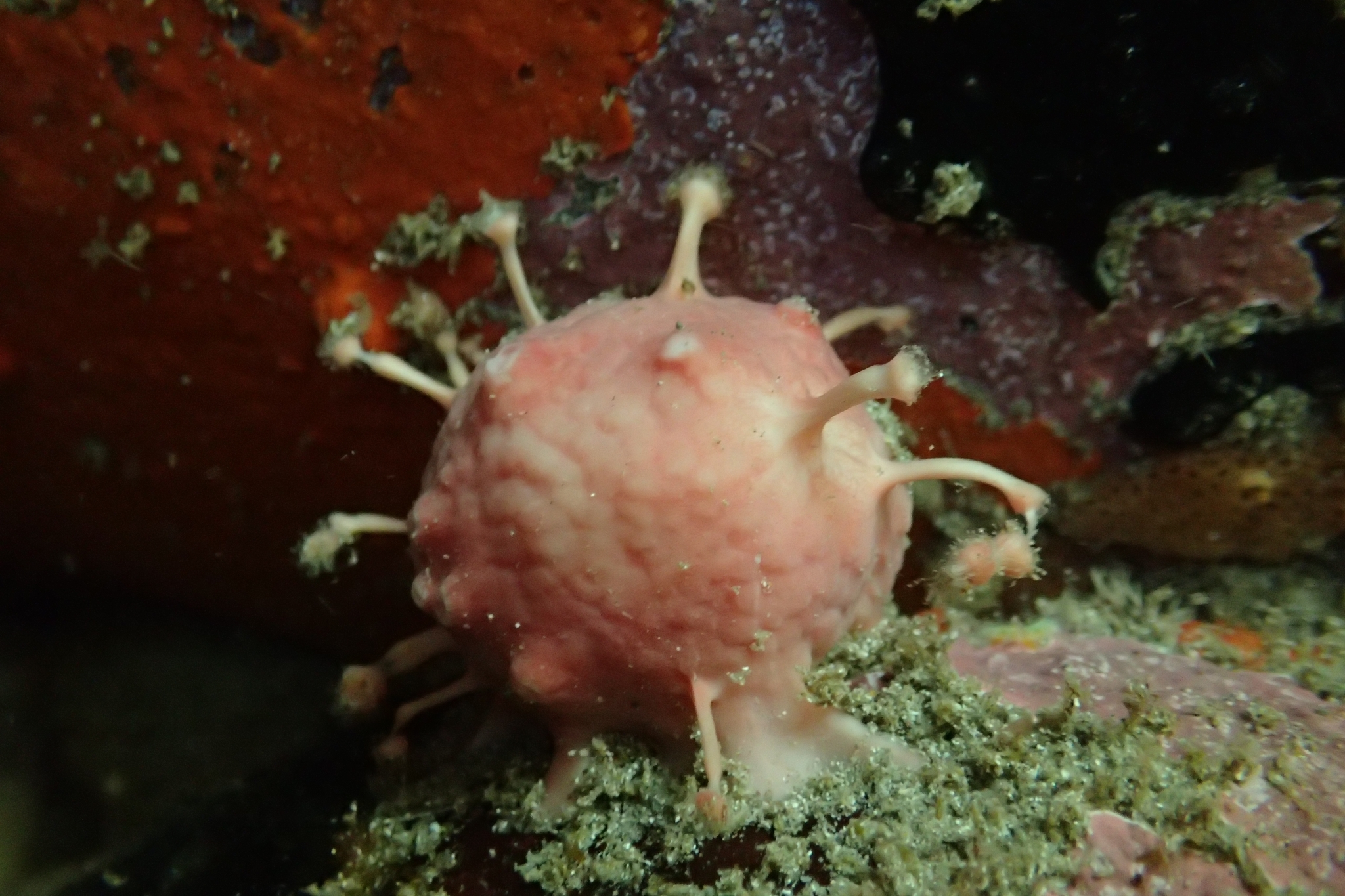

Scientific classification
- Kingdom: Animalia
- Phylum: Porifera
- Class: Demospongiae
- Order: Tethyida
- Family: Tethyidae
- Genus: Tethya
- Species: T. bergquistae

Binomial name
- Tethya bergquistae Hooper, 1994

Synonyms
- Tethya australis Bergquist & Kelly-Borges, 1991

= Tethya bergquistae =

Species of sponge

Tethya bergquistae is a species of sea sponge belonging to the family Tethyidae.

In Australia, it is found in off the Victorian, South Australian and Tasmanian coasts, and in New Zealand off the shores of both North and South Islands.

It was first described by John Hooper in 1994.
