= C9H16N3O14P3 =

The molecular formula C_{9}H_{16}N_{3}O_{14}P_{3} (molar mass: 483.16 g/mol) may refer to:

- Cytidine triphosphate
- Arabinofuranosylcytosine triphosphate
