= C4H4N2OS =

The molecular formula C_{4}H_{4}N_{2}OS (molar mass: 128.15 g/mol, exact mass: 128.0044 u) may refer to:

- 2-Thiouracil
- 4-Thiouracil
