= Tectitethya =

Scientific classification
- Kingdom: Animalia
- Phylum: Porifera
- Class: Demospongiae
- Order: Tethyida
- Family: Tethyidae
- Genus: Tectitethya; Sarà, 1994

Species
- See text

Genus of sponges

Tectitethya is a genus of sea sponges belonging to the family Tethyidae. There are five described species in this genus with the first member having been described in 1900.

== Species ==
Species in this genus include:

- Tectitethya crypta (de Laubenfels, 1949)
- Tectitethya keyensis Sarà & Bavestrello, 1996
- Tectitethya macrostella Sarà & Bavestrello, 1996
- Tectitethya raphyroides Sarà & Bavestrello, 1996
- Tectitethya topsenti (Thiele, 1900)
