= Abequosyltransferase =

Class of enzymes

abequosyltransferase

Identifiers
- EC no.: 2.4.1.60
- CAS no.: 37277-67-1

Databases
- IntEnz: IntEnz view
- BRENDA: BRENDA entry
- ExPASy: NiceZyme view
- KEGG: KEGG entry
- MetaCyc: metabolic pathway
- PRIAM: profile
- PDB structures: RCSB PDB PDBe PDBsum
- Gene Ontology: AmiGO / QuickGO
Search
- PMC: articles
- PubMed: articles
- NCBI: proteins

In enzymology, an abequosyltransferase (EC 2.4.1.60) is an enzyme that catalyzes the chemical reaction

CDP-abequose + D-mannosyl-L-rhamnosyl-D-galactose-1-diphospholipid $\rightleftharpoons$ CDP + D-abequosyl-D-mannosyl-rhamnosyl-D-galactose-1-diphospholipid

Thus, the two substrates of this enzyme are CDP-abequose and D-mannosyl-L-rhamnosyl-D-galactose-1-diphospholipid, whereas its two products are CDP and D-abequosyl-D-mannosyl-rhamnosyl-D-galactose-1-diphospholipid.

This enzyme belongs to the family of glycosyltransferases, specifically the hexosyltransferases. The systematic name of this enzyme class is CDP-abequose:D-mannosyl-L-rhamnosyl-D-galactose-1-diphospholipid D-abequosyltransferase. This enzyme is also called trihexose diphospholipid abequosyltransferase.
