= Tethya samaaii =

Scientific classification
- Kingdom: Animalia
- Phylum: Porifera
- Class: Demospongiae
- Order: Tethyida
- Family: Tethyidae
- Genus: Tethya
- Species: T. samaaii

Binomial name
- Tethya samaaii Ribeiro & Muricy, 2011

Synonyms
- Tethya rubra Samaai & Gibbons, 2005

Species of sponge

Tethya samaaii, also known as the red golf ball sponge, is a species of sea sponge belonging to the family Tethyidae. It is spherical in shape and grows to about 6 cm in diameter. It is reddish in colour. It appears to be endemic to the west coast of South Africa and has been found in 12m of water.
