= S-adenosylhomocysteine hydrolase =

S-adenosylhomocysteine hydrolase may refer to:

- Adenosylhomocysteinase, an enzyme
- Adenosylhomocysteine nucleosidase, an enzyme

== See also ==
- S-adenosylhomocysteine deaminase, an enzyme
