= C10H14N5O7P =

The molecular formula C_{10}H_{14}N_{5}O_{7}P (molar mass: 347.22 g/mol) may refer to:

- Adenosine monophosphate (AMP)
- Deoxyguanosine monophosphate (dGMP)
- Vidarabine phosphate
