= C10H13N5O4 =

The molecular formula C_{10}H_{13}N_{5}O_{4} (molar mass: 267.24 g/mol) may refer to:

- Adenosine
- Deoxyguanosine
- Vidarabine, or 9-β-D-arabinofuranosyladenine (ara-A)
- Zidovudine
