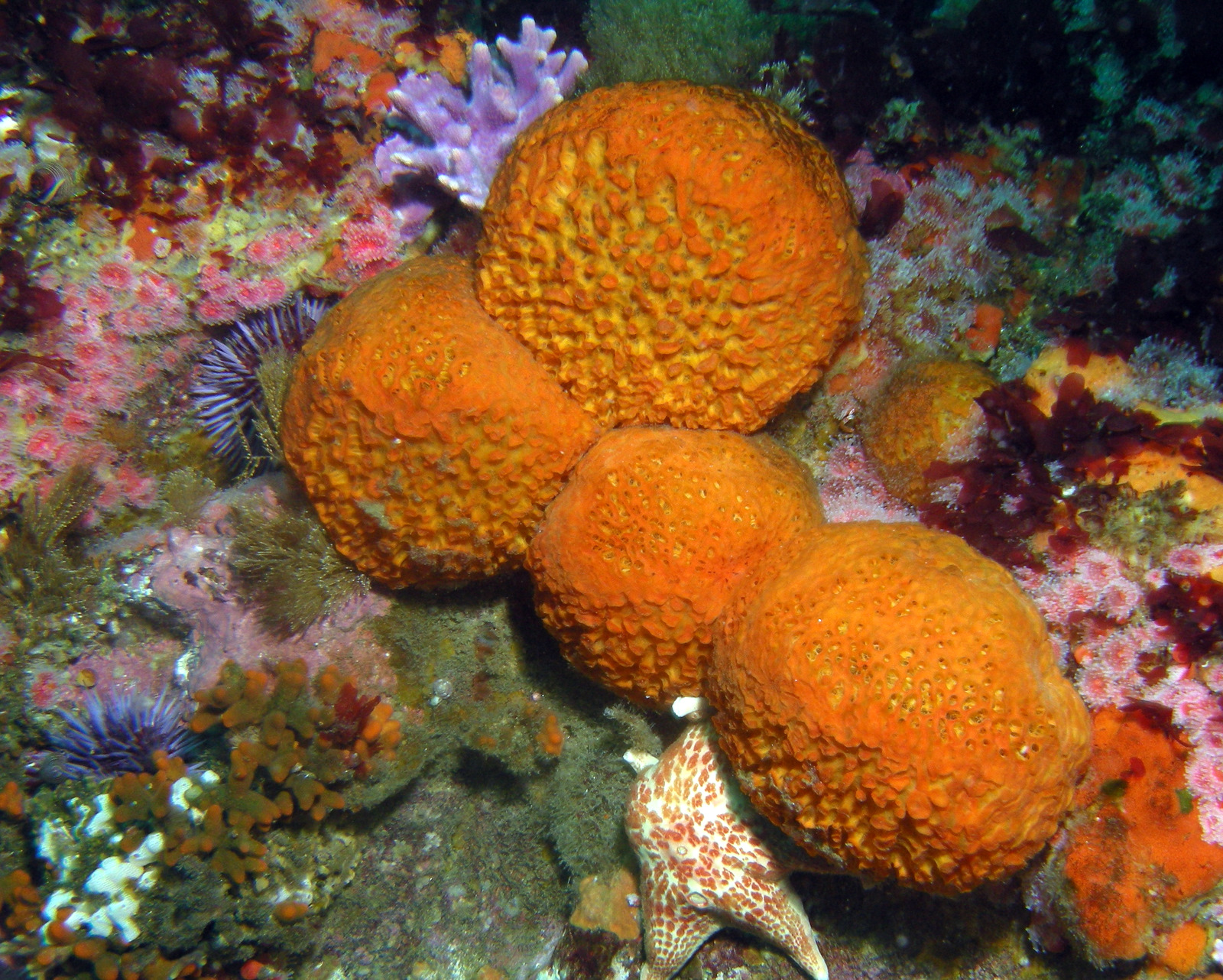
- Tethya aurantium

Scientific classification
- Kingdom: Animalia
- Phylum: Porifera
- Class: Demospongiae
- Order: Tethyida
- Family: Tethyidae
- Genus: Tethya; Lamarck, 1815

Species
- See text

Synonyms
- List: Donatia Nardo, 1833; Tethea Johnston, 1842 [lapsus]; Tethyum Lieberkühn, 1859; Amniscos Gray, 1867; Alemo Wright, 1881; Tethyorraphis Lendenfeld, 1888 [lapsus]; Tethyorrhaphis Lendenfeld, 1888; Taboga de Laubenfels, 1936

= Tethya =

Genus of sponges

Tethya is a genus of sea sponges belonging to the family Tethyidae. Members of this genus all have a spherical body form and some are known to be able to move at speeds of between 1 and 4 mm per day.

== Species ==
The following species are recognised in the genus Tethya:

- Tethya actinia de Laubenfels, 1950
- Tethya acuta Sarà & Sarà, 2004
- Tethya amplexa Bergquist & Kelly-Borges, 1991
- Tethya andamanensis Dendy & Burton, 1926
- Tethya asbestella Lamarck, 1815
- Tethya aurantium (Pallas, 1766)
- Tethya beatrizae Ribeiro & Muricy, 2011
- Tethya bergquistae Hooper, 1994
- Tethya bitylastra Mácola & Menegola, 2018
- Tethya boeroi Sarà, 1992
- Tethya brasiliana Ribeiro & Muricy, 2004
- Tethya bullae Bergquist & Kelly-Borges, 1991
- Tethya burtoni Sarà & Sarà, 2004
- Tethya californiana de Laubenfels, 1932
- Tethya citrina Sarà & Melone, 1965
- Tethya coccinea Bergquist & Kelly-Borges, 1991
- Tethya communis Bergquist & Kelly-Borges, 1991
- Tethya comorensis Sarà, Corriero & Bavestrello, 1993
- Tethya compacta Bergquist, 1961
- Tethya cyanae Ribeiro & Muricy, 2004
- Tethya deformis Thiele, 1898
- Tethya dendyi Sarà & Sarà, 2004
- Tethya densa Sarà, 1992
- Tethya diploderma Schmidt, 1870
- Tethya ensis Sarà, Gómez & Sarà, 2001
- Tethya expansa Sarà & Sarà, 2004
- Tethya fastigiata Bergquist & Kelly-Borges, 1991
- Tethya fissurata Lendenfeld, 1888
- Tethya flexuosa Sarà & Sarà, 2004
- Tethya gigantea (Lendenfeld, 1888)
- Tethya globostellata Lendenfeld, 1897
- Tethya globum Duchassaing & Michelotti, 1864
- Tethya gracilis Sarà, Sarà, Nickel & Brümmer, 2001
- Tethya gunni Sarà & Sarà, 2004
- Tethya hibernica Heim, Nickel, Picton & Brümmer, 2007
- Tethya hooperi Sarà & Sarà, 2004
- Tethya ignis Ribeiro & Muricy, 2004
- Tethya ingalli Bowerbank, 1858
- Tethya irisae Sorokin, Ekins, Yang & Cárdenas, 2019
- Tethya irregularis Sarà & Bavestrello, 1998
- Tethya japonica Sollas, 1888
- Tethya laevis (Lendenfeld, 1888)
- Tethya levii Sarà, 1988
- Tethya leysae Heim & Nickel, 2010
- †Tethya logani Dawson, 1857
- Tethya magna Kirkpatrick, 1903
- Tethya maza Selenka, 1879
- Tethya melinka Hajdu, Desqueyroux-Faúndez, Carvalho, Lôbo-Hajdu & Willenz, 2013
- Tethya meloni Corriero, Gadaleta & Bavestrello, 2015
- Tethya mexicana Sarà, Gómez & Sarà, 2001
- Tethya microstella Sarà, 1990
- Tethya minuta Sarà, Sarà, Nickel & Brümmer, 2001
- Tethya monstrosa (Burton, 1924)
- Tethya mortoni Bergquist & Kelly-Borges, 1991
- Tethya multifida (Carter, 1882)
- Tethya multistella Lendenfeld, 1888
- Tethya nicolae Ribeiro & Muricy, 2011
- Tethya norvegica Bowerbank, 1872
- Tethya novaecaledoniae Sarà, 1988
- Tethya nux (Selenka, 1867)
- Tethya omanensis Sarà & Bavestrello, 1995
- Tethya ornata Sarà, Bavestrello & Calcinai, 2000
- Tethya orphei Sarà, 1990
- Tethya ovum Sarà, Gómez & Sarà, 2001
- Tethya papillosa (Thiele, 1905)
- Tethya paroxeata Sarà, Gómez & Sarà, 2001
- Tethya parvistella (Baer, 1906)
- Tethya parvula Ribeiro & Muricy, 2011
- Tethya pellis Bergquist & Kelly-Borges, 1991
- Tethya peracuata (Topsent, 1918)
- Tethya popae Bergquist & Kelly-Borges, 1991
- Tethya pulchra Sarà, 1992
- Tethya pulitzeri Sarà & Sarà, 2004
- Tethya robusta (Bowerbank, 1873)
- Tethya rubra Samaai & Gibbons, 2005
- Tethya samaaii Ribeiro & Muricy, 2011
- Tethya sarai Desqueyroux-Faúndez & van Soest, 1997
- Tethya seychellensis (Wright, 1881)
- Tethya simi Sarà, Bavestrello & Calcinai, 2000
- Tethya socius Sarà, Gómez & Sarà, 2001
- Tethya solangeae Ribeiro & Muricy, 2011
- Tethya sollasi Bergquist & Kelly-Borges, 1991
- Tethya songakensis Kim & Sim, 2005
- Tethya stellagrandis (Dendy, 1916)
- Tethya stellodermis Sarà & Sarà, 2004
- Tethya stolonifera Bergquist & Kelly-Borges, 1991
- Tethya strongylata Sarà, Bavestrello & Calcinai, 2000
- Tethya taboga (de Laubenfels, 1936)
- Tethya tasmaniae Sarà & Sarà, 2004
- Tethya tenuisclera Sarà & Corriero, 1994
- Tethya topsenti Sarà, Bavestrello & Calcinai, 2000
- Tethya uljinensis Shim & Sim, 2008
- Tethya vacua Austin, Ott, Reiswig, Romagosa & McDaniel, 2014
- Tethya varians Sarà & Bavestrello, 1998
- Tethya viridis (Baer, 1906)
- Tethya wilhelma Sarà, Sarà, Nickel & Brümmer, 2001
