= S-methyl-5'-thioadenosine deaminase =

Identifiers
- EC no.: 3.5.4.31

Databases
- BRENDA: enzyme data
- ExPASy: NiceZyme view
- KEGG: enzyme entry
- MetaCyc: metabolic pathway
- Rhea: reactions
- PDB structures: RCSB PDB PDBe PDBsum
Search
- PMC: articles
- PubMed: articles
- NCBI: proteins

S-methyl-5'-thioadenosine deaminase (EC 3.5.4.31, MTA deaminase, 5-methylthioadenosine deaminase) is an enzyme with systematic name S-methyl-5'-thioadenosine amidohydrolase. This enzyme catalyses the following hydrolysis reaction, giving ammonia as a byproduct:

5′-Methylthioadenosine
H_{2}O
NH_{3}
5'-S-methyl-5'-thioinosine

The enzyme from Thermotoga maritima also functions as an S-adenosylhomocysteine deaminase. In Pseudomonas aeruginosa this is the first step in the catabolism of 5′-methylthioadenosine. The product is acted on by S-methyl-5'-thioinosine phosphorylase to give S-methyl-5-thio-α-D-ribose 1-phosphate and hypoxanthine. These reactions are part of the salvage pathway for 5′-methylthioadenosine, produced by radical SAM enzymes.
