= List of MeSH codes (D20) =

The following is a partial list of the "D" codes for Medical Subject Headings (MeSH), as defined by the United States National Library of Medicine (NLM).

This list continues the information at List of MeSH codes (D13). Codes following these are found at List of MeSH codes (D23). For other MeSH codes, see List of MeSH codes.

The source for this content is the set of MeSH Browser from the NLM.

== MeSH D20 – complex mixtures ==
=== MeSH D20.215 – biological products ===
==== MeSH D20.215.401 – immune sera ====
- MeSH D20.215.401.203 – antilymphocyte serum
- MeSH D20.215.401.601 – antitoxins
- MeSH D20.215.401.601.163 – antivenins
- MeSH D20.215.401.601.276 – botulinum antitoxin
- MeSH D20.215.401.601.388 – diphtheria antitoxin
- MeSH D20.215.401.601.824 – tetanus antitoxin

==== MeSH D20.215.721 – plant exudates ====
- MeSH D20.215.721.061 – gutta-percha
- MeSH D20.215.721.124 – latex
- MeSH D20.215.721.249 – plant gums
- MeSH D20.215.721.249.249 – chewing gum
- MeSH D20.215.721.249.500 – gum arabic
- MeSH D20.215.721.249.625 – karaya gum
- MeSH D20.215.721.249.750 – tragacanth
- MeSH D20.215.721.500 – resins, plant
- MeSH D20.215.721.500.109 – amber
- MeSH D20.215.721.500.219 – balsams
- MeSH D20.215.721.500.354 – frankincense
- MeSH D20.215.721.500.490 – guaiac
- MeSH D20.215.721.500.626 – mastic resin
- MeSH D20.215.721.500.762 – propolis
- MeSH D20.215.721.500.881 – turpentine

==== MeSH D20.215.784 – plant preparations ====
- MeSH D20.215.784.249 – coffee
- MeSH D20.215.784.500 – plant extracts
- MeSH D20.215.784.500.087 – flower essences
- MeSH D20.215.784.500.200 – curare
- MeSH D20.215.784.500.350 – drugs, chinese herbal
- MeSH D20.215.784.500.375 – ginkgo extract
- MeSH D20.215.784.500.400 – grape seed extract
- MeSH D20.215.784.500.450 – ipecac
- MeSH D20.215.784.500.492 – lecithins
- MeSH D20.215.784.500.534 – opium
- MeSH D20.215.784.500.618 – pectins
- MeSH D20.215.784.500.618.500 – rhamnogalacturonans
- MeSH D20.215.784.500.647 – picrotoxin
- MeSH D20.215.784.500.675 – podophyllin
- MeSH D20.215.784.500.720 – psyllium
- MeSH D20.215.784.500.860 – senna extract
- MeSH D20.215.784.500.860.500 – sennosides
- MeSH D20.215.784.750 – plant oils
- MeSH D20.215.784.750.033 – eucalyptus oil
- MeSH D20.215.784.750.066 – rapeseed oil
- MeSH D20.215.784.750.132 – castor oil
- MeSH D20.215.784.750.186 – clove oil
- MeSH D20.215.784.750.240 – corn oil
- MeSH D20.215.784.750.263 – cottonseed oil
- MeSH D20.215.784.750.315 – croton oil
- MeSH D20.215.784.750.550 – iodized oil
- MeSH D20.215.784.750.550.300 – ethiodized oil
- MeSH D20.215.784.750.615 – linseed oil
- MeSH D20.215.784.750.728 – palm oil
- MeSH D20.215.784.750.784 – rice bran oil
- MeSH D20.215.784.750.840 – safflower oil
- MeSH D20.215.784.750.865 – sesame oil
- MeSH D20.215.784.750.880 – soybean oil
- MeSH D20.215.784.750.910 – sunflower oil
- MeSH D20.215.784.750.940 – tea tree oil
- MeSH D20.215.784.844 – tea
- MeSH D20.215.784.844.500 – kombucha tea
- MeSH D20.215.784.937 – teas, herbal

==== MeSH D20.215.894 – vaccines ====
- MeSH D20.215.894.067 – alzheimer vaccines
- MeSH D20.215.894.135 – bacterial vaccines
- MeSH D20.215.894.135.063 – anthrax vaccines
- MeSH D20.215.894.135.098 – autovaccines
- MeSH D20.215.894.135.134 – brucella vaccine
- MeSH D20.215.894.135.225 – cholera vaccines
- MeSH D20.215.894.135.310 – diphtheria-tetanus vaccine
- MeSH D20.215.894.135.390 – escherichia coli vaccines
- MeSH D20.215.894.135.450 – haemophilus vaccines
- MeSH D20.215.894.135.492 – lyme disease vaccines
- MeSH D20.215.894.135.500 – meningococcal vaccines
- MeSH D20.215.894.135.535 – pertussis vaccine
- MeSH D20.215.894.135.535.295 – diphtheria-tetanus-acellular pertussis vaccines
- MeSH D20.215.894.135.535.300 – diphtheria-tetanus-pertussis vaccine
- MeSH D20.215.894.135.609 – plague vaccine
- MeSH D20.215.894.135.620 – pseudomonas vaccines
- MeSH D20.215.894.135.650 – rickettsial vaccines
- MeSH D20.215.894.135.685 – salmonella vaccines
- MeSH D20.215.894.135.685.910 – typhoid-paratyphoid vaccines
- MeSH D20.215.894.135.720 – shigella vaccines
- MeSH D20.215.894.135.744 – staphylococcal vaccines
- MeSH D20.215.894.135.750 – streptococcal vaccines
- MeSH D20.215.894.135.750.600 – pneumococcal vaccines
- MeSH D20.215.894.135.750.600.500 – heptavalent pneumococcal conjugate vaccine
- MeSH D20.215.894.135.825 – tuberculosis vaccines
- MeSH D20.215.894.135.825.100 – bcg vaccine
- MeSH D20.215.894.200 – cancer vaccines
- MeSH D20.215.894.354 – fungal vaccines
- MeSH D20.215.894.468 – nanovaccines
- MeSH D20.215.894.582 – protozoan vaccines
- MeSH D20.215.894.582.480 – leishmaniasis vaccines
- MeSH D20.215.894.582.500 – malaria vaccines
- MeSH D20.215.894.691 – toxoids
- MeSH D20.215.894.691.263 – diphtheria toxoid
- MeSH D20.215.894.691.263.290 – diphtheria-tetanus-acellular pertussis vaccines
- MeSH D20.215.894.691.263.300 – diphtheria-tetanus-pertussis vaccine
- MeSH D20.215.894.691.263.310 – diphtheria-tetanus vaccine
- MeSH D20.215.894.691.681 – staphylococcal toxoid
- MeSH D20.215.894.691.824 – tetanus toxoid
- MeSH D20.215.894.691.824.290 – diphtheria-tetanus-acellular pertussis vaccines
- MeSH D20.215.894.691.824.300 – diphtheria-tetanus-pertussis vaccine
- MeSH D20.215.894.691.824.310 – diphtheria-tetanus vaccine
- MeSH D20.215.894.811 – vaccines, attenuated
- MeSH D20.215.894.815 – vaccines, combined
- MeSH D20.215.894.815.149 – diphtheria-tetanus-acellular pertussis vaccines
- MeSH D20.215.894.815.300 – diphtheria-tetanus-pertussis vaccine
- MeSH D20.215.894.815.320 – diphtheria-tetanus vaccine
- MeSH D20.215.894.815.410 – heptavalent pneumococcal conjugate vaccine
- MeSH D20.215.894.815.455 – human papillomavirus recombinant vaccine quadrivalent, types 6, 11, 16, 18
- MeSH D20.215.894.815.500 – measles-mumps-rubella vaccine
- MeSH D20.215.894.815.750 – bnt162b5
- MeSH D20.215.894.818 – vaccines, contraceptive
- MeSH D20.215.894.830 – vaccines, inactivated
- MeSH D20.215.894.830.614 – poliovirus vaccine, inactivated
- MeSH D20.215.894.845 – vaccines, marker
- MeSH D20.215.894.860 – vaccines, subunit
- MeSH D20.215.894.860.449 – iscoms
- MeSH D20.215.894.860.900 – vaccines, acellular
- MeSH D20.215.894.860.900.267 – diphtheria-tetanus-acellular pertussis vaccines
- MeSH D20.215.894.860.900.450 – mrna vaccines
- MeSH D20.215.894.860.900.633 – protein subunit vaccines
- MeSH D20.215.894.860.915 – vaccines, edible
- MeSH D20.215.894.865 – vaccines, synthetic
- MeSH D20.215.894.865.450 – nucleic acid-based vaccines
- MeSH D20.215.894.865.450.250 – vaccines, dna
- MeSH D20.215.894.865.450.250.500 – chadox1 ncov-19
- MeSH D20.215.894.865.450.500 – mrna vaccines
- MeSH D20.215.894.865.450.500.500 – 2019-ncov vaccine mrna-1273
- MeSH D20.215.894.865.450.500.750 – bnt162 vaccine
- MeSH D20.215.894.865.450.500.875 – bnt162b5
- MeSH D20.215.894.865.900 – vaccines, conjugate
- MeSH D20.215.894.865.915 – vaccines, edible
- MeSH D20.215.894.865.940 – vaccines, virosome
- MeSH D20.215.894.865.955 – vaccines, virus-like particle
- MeSH D20.215.894.882 – vaccines, live, unattenuated
- MeSH D20.215.894.899 – viral vaccines
- MeSH D20.215.894.899.024 – adenovirus vaccines
- MeSH D20.215.894.899.050 – aids vaccines
- MeSH D20.215.894.899.085 – covid-19 vaccines
- MeSH D20.215.894.899.085.063 – chadox1 ncov-19
- MeSH D20.215.894.899.085.125 – ad26covs1
- MeSH D20.215.894.899.085.250 – 2019-ncov vaccine mrna-1273
- MeSH D20.215.894.899.085.500 – bnt162 vaccine
- MeSH D20.215.894.899.085.750 – bnt162b5
- MeSH D20.215.894.899.120 – cytomegalovirus vaccines
- MeSH D20.215.894.899.162 – dengue vaccines
- MeSH D20.215.894.899.205 – ebola vaccines
- MeSH D20.215.894.899.290 – herpesvirus vaccines
- MeSH D20.215.894.899.290.130 – chickenpox vaccine
- MeSH D20.215.894.899.290.130.400 – herpes zoster vaccine
- MeSH D20.215.894.899.290.400 – herpes simplex virus vaccines
- MeSH D20.215.894.899.290.500 – marek disease vaccines
- MeSH D20.215.894.899.302 – influenza vaccines
- MeSH D20.215.894.899.320 – japanese encephalitis vaccines
- MeSH D20.215.894.899.404 – measles vaccine
- MeSH D20.215.894.899.404.500 – measles-mumps-rubella vaccine
- MeSH D20.215.894.899.488 – mumps vaccine
- MeSH D20.215.894.899.488.500 – measles-mumps-rubella vaccine
- MeSH D20.215.894.899.498 – papillomavirus vaccines
- MeSH D20.215.894.899.498.500 – human papillomavirus recombinant vaccine quadrivalent, types 6, 11, 16, 18
- MeSH D20.215.894.899.500 – parainfluenza vaccines
- MeSH D20.215.894.899.623 – poliovirus vaccines
- MeSH D20.215.894.899.623.500 – poliovirus vaccine, inactivated
- MeSH D20.215.894.899.623.750 – poliovirus vaccine, oral
- MeSH D20.215.894.899.632 – pseudorabies vaccines
- MeSH D20.215.894.899.700 – rabies vaccines
- MeSH D20.215.894.899.730 – respiratory syncytial virus vaccines
- MeSH D20.215.894.899.760 – rotavirus vaccines
- MeSH D20.215.894.899.779 – rubella vaccine
- MeSH D20.215.894.899.779.500 – measles-mumps-rubella vaccine
- MeSH D20.215.894.899.790 – saids vaccines
- MeSH D20.215.894.899.859 – smallpox vaccine
- MeSH D20.215.894.899.955 – viral hepatitis vaccines
- MeSH D20.215.894.899.955.395 – hepatitis a vaccines
- MeSH D20.215.894.899.955.400 – hepatitis b vaccines
- MeSH D20.215.894.899.962 – west nile virus vaccines
- MeSH D20.215.894.899.970 – yellow fever vaccine

=== MeSH D20.280 – colloids ===
==== MeSH D20.280.055 – aerosols ====
- MeSH D20.280.055.500 – nasal sprays
- MeSH D20.280.055.750 – oral sprays

==== MeSH D20.280.320 – gels ====
- MeSH D20.280.320.001 – aerogels
- MeSH D20.280.320.375 – hydrogels
- MeSH D20.280.320.375.500 – cryogels
- MeSH D20.280.320.531 – microgels
- MeSH D20.280.320.609 – nanogels
- MeSH D20.280.320.609.500 – hydrogel, polyethylene glycol dimethacrylate
- MeSH D20.280.320.687 – silica gel

=== MeSH D20.345 – fossil fuels ===
==== MeSH D20.345.108 – coal ====
- MeSH D20.345.108.110 – coke

==== MeSH D20.345.630 – petroleum ====
- MeSH D20.345.630.500 – fuel oils
- MeSH D20.345.630.540 – gasoline
- MeSH D20.345.630.600 – kerosene

=== MeSH D20.633 – particulate matter ===
==== MeSH D20.633.222 – dust ====
- MeSH D20.633.222.200 – cosmic dust

==== MeSH D20.633.937 – smoke ====
- MeSH D20.633.937.339 – soot
- MeSH D20.633.937.680 – tobacco smoke pollution

=== MeSH D20.777 – tissue extracts ===
==== MeSH D20.777.500 – pancreatic extracts ====
- MeSH D20.777.500.720 – pancreatin
- MeSH D20.777.500.745 – pancrelipase

=== MeSH D20.888 – venoms ===
==== MeSH D20.888.033 – amphibian venoms ====
- MeSH D20.888.033.112 – batrachotoxins
- MeSH D20.888.033.137 – bombesin
- MeSH D20.888.033.163 – bufotenin
- MeSH D20.888.033.728 – physalaemin

==== MeSH D20.888.065 – arthropod venoms ====
- MeSH D20.888.065.055 – ant venoms
- MeSH D20.888.065.115 – bee venoms
- MeSH D20.888.065.115.060 – apamin
- MeSH D20.888.065.115.580 – melitten
- MeSH D20.888.065.830 – scorpion venoms
- MeSH D20.888.065.830.150 – charybdotoxin
- MeSH D20.888.065.870 – spider venoms
- MeSH D20.888.065.870.324 – agatoxins
- MeSH D20.888.065.870.324.500 – omega-agatoxin iva
- MeSH D20.888.065.970 – wasp venoms

==== MeSH D20.888.590 – mollusk venoms ====
- MeSH D20.888.590.162 – conotoxins
- MeSH D20.888.590.162.720 – omega-conotoxins
- MeSH D20.888.590.162.720.700 – omega-conotoxin gvia
- MeSH D20.888.590.325 – eledoisin
- MeSH D20.888.590.662 – saxitoxin

==== MeSH D20.888.850 – snake venoms ====
- MeSH D20.888.850.325 – elapid venoms
- MeSH D20.888.850.325.139 – bungarotoxins
- MeSH D20.888.850.325.180 – cobra cardiotoxin proteins
- MeSH D20.888.850.325.200 – cobra neurotoxin proteins
- MeSH D20.888.850.325.600 – three finger toxins
- MeSH D20.888.850.960 – viper venoms
- MeSH D20.888.850.960.200 – crotalid venoms
- MeSH D20.888.850.960.200.050 – ancrod
- MeSH D20.888.850.960.200.105 – batroxobin
- MeSH D20.888.850.960.200.158 – bothrops jararaca venom
- MeSH D20.888.850.960.200.210 – crotoxin

=== MeSH D20.944 – waste products ===
==== MeSH D20.944.380 – hazardous waste ====
- MeSH D20.944.380.638 – radioactive waste

==== MeSH D20.944.460 – medical waste ====
- MeSH D20.944.460.150 – dental waste
- MeSH D20.944.460.300 – medical waste disposal

==== MeSH D20.944.730 – solid waste ====
- MeSH D20.944.730.500 – biosolids

==== MeSH D20.944.932 – wastewater ====
- MeSH D20.944.932.500 – sewage

The list continues at List of MeSH codes (D23).
