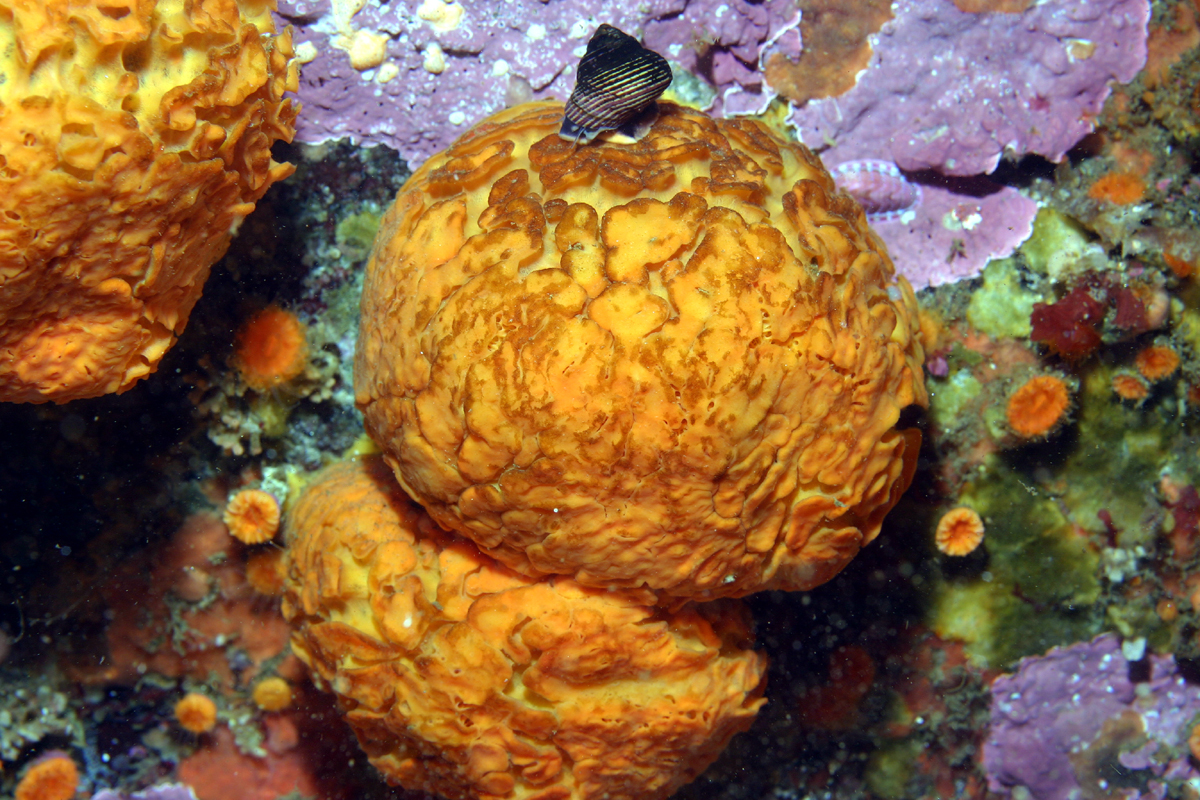

Scientific classification
- Kingdom: Animalia
- Phylum: Porifera
- Class: Demospongiae
- Order: Tethyida
- Family: Tethyidae
- Genus: Tethya
- Species: T. aurantium

Binomial name
- Tethya aurantium (Pallas, 1766)

Synonyms
- List: Alcyonium aurantium Pallas, 1766; Alcyonium lyncurium Linnaeus, 1767; Amniscos morum (Schmidt, 1862); Donatia lyncurium (Linnaeus, 1767); Spongia verrucosa sensu Montagu, 1814; Tethea lyncurium (Linnaeus, 1767); Tethya aurantia (Pallas, 1766) [lapsus]; Tethya limski Müller & Zahn, 1968; Tethya lyncurium (Linnaeus, 1767); Tethya morum Schmidt, 1862; Tethyum lyncurium (Linnaeus, 1767)

= Tethya aurantium =

Species of sponge

Tethya aurantium, also known as the golf ball sponge or orange puffball sponge, is a species of sea sponge belonging to the family Tethyidae. It is spherical in shape, with a warty surface, and grows to about 10 cm in diameter. Oscula are present on the upper surface. The surface has sharp protruding spicules which can cause skin irritation if touched.

It is found in the Mediterranean Sea and North Eastern Atlantic Ocean, and from southern Namibia round the southern African coast to KwaZulu-Natal, usually on shallow reefs. They are also found from Southeastern Alaska to central Baja California, from low intertidal to 1,460 feet (440 m).

It was first described by Peter Simon Pallas in 1766 as Alcyonium aurantium.

== Biology ==
Unlike most other species of sponges, the openings known as osculum are difficult to see with the naked eye. The surface of their body carries pores known as ostia, where they filter water to catch microscopic plankton with flagella.
