= S-methyl-5'-thioinosine phosphorylase =

Class of enzymes

Identifiers
- EC no.: 2.4.2.44

Databases
- IntEnz: IntEnz view
- BRENDA: BRENDA entry
- ExPASy: NiceZyme view
- KEGG: KEGG entry
- MetaCyc: metabolic pathway
- PRIAM: profile
- PDB structures: RCSB PDB PDBe PDBsum
Search
- PMC: articles
- PubMed: articles
- NCBI: proteins

S-methyl-5'-thioinosine phosphorylase (EC 2.4.2.44, MTIP, MTI phosphorylase, methylthioinosine phosphorylase) is an enzyme with systematic name S-methyl-5'-thioinosine:phosphate S-methyl-5-thio-alpha-D-ribosyl-transferase. This enzyme catalyses the phosphorolysis reaction in which orthophosphate (P_{i}) cleaves a ribose sugar:

5'-S-methyl-5'-thioinosine
P_{i}
S-methyl-5-thio-α-D-ribose 1-phosphate
+
hypoxanthine

This is the second step in the catabolism of 5′-methylthioadenosine in Pseudomonas aeruginosa. The first step is a deamination catalysed by S-methyl-5'-thioadenosine deaminase to give S-methyl-5'-thioinosine, which is the substrate here. The products are S-methyl-5-thio-α-D-ribose 1-phosphate and hypoxanthine.
