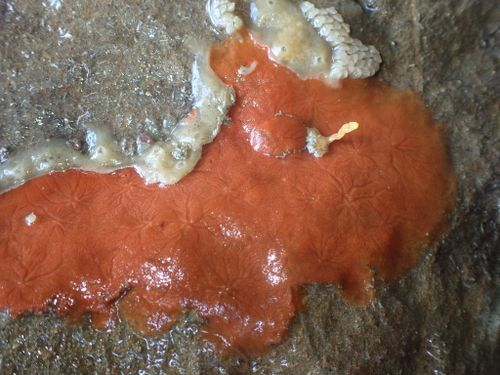
- Timea aurantiaca

Scientific classification
- Kingdom: Animalia
- Phylum: Porifera
- Class: Demospongiae
- Order: Tethyida
- Family: Timeidae
- Genus: Timea; Gray, 1867

= Timea (sponge) =

Family of sponges

Timea is a genus of sponges in the order Tethyida first described in 1867 by Gray. It is the only member of the family Timeidae, described by Émile Topsent in 1928.
