= Adenosylhomocysteine nucleosidase =

Class of enzymes

Identifiers
- EC no.: 3.2.2.9
- CAS no.: 9055-10-1

Databases
- BRENDA: enzyme data
- ExPASy: NiceZyme view
- KEGG: enzyme entry
- MetaCyc: metabolic pathway
- Rhea: reactions
- PDB structures: RCSB PDB PDBe PDBsum
- Gene Ontology: AmiGO / QuickGO
Search
- PMC: articles
- PubMed: articles
- NCBI: proteins

Adenosylhomocysteine nucleosidase (EC 3.2.2.9) is an enzyme that catalyzes three related hydrolysis reactions. In one, bacterial enzyme characterised from Escherichia coli was shown to convert S-adenosyl-L-homocysteine to S-ribosylhomocysteine and adenine:

S-adenosyl-L-homocysteine
H_{2}O
S-ribosylhomocysteine
+
adenine

The second reaction catalysed by the enzyme converts 5'-deoxyadenosine to 5-deoxy-D-ribose and adenine:

5'-deoxyadenosine
H_{2}O
5-deoxy-D-ribose
+ adenine

Finally, the enzyme can convert 5′-methylthioadenosine to S-methyl-5-thio-D-ribose and adenine:

5′-methylthioadenosine
H_{2}O
S-methyl-5-thio-D-ribose
+ adenine

The enzyme has been studied because its inhibition might lead to the development of novel antibiotics.

This enzyme is a hydrolase, specifically a glycosylase that hydrolyses N-glycosyl compounds. The systematic name of this enzyme class is S-adenosyl-L-homocysteine homocysteinylribohydrolase. Other names in common use include S-adenosylhomocysteine hydrolase (ambiguous), S-adenosylhomocysteine nucleosidase, 5'-methyladenosine nucleosidase, S-adenosylhomocysteine/5'-methylthioadenosine nucleosidase, and AdoHcy/MTA nucleosidase.

== Structural studies ==
As of late 2007, 8 structures have been solved for this class of enzymes, with PDB accession codes PDB: 1JYS, PDB: 1NC1, PDB: 1NC3, PDB: 1Y6Q, PDB: 1Y6R, PDB: 1Z5N, PDB: 1Z5O, and PDB: 1Z5P.
