= Vidarabine phosphate =

Names
- IUPAC name (1R)-1-(6-Amino-9H-purin-9-yl)-1,4-anhydro-1-deoxy-β-D-arabinitiol 5-(dihydrogen phosphate)
- Systematic IUPAC name [(2R,3S,4S,5R)-5-(6-Amino-9H-purin-9-yl)-3,4-dihydroxyoxolan-2-yl]methyl dihydrogen phosphate

Identifiers
CAS Number	29984-33-6
3D model (JSmol)	Interactive image
ChEBI	CHEBI:117144
ChemSpider	31993
ECHA InfoCard	100.045.431
MeSH	Vidarabine+phosphate
PubChem CID	34768
UNII	106XV160TZ
CompTox Dashboard (EPA)	DTXSID401009318
- InChI: InChI=1S/C10H14N5O7P/c11-8-5-9(13-2-12-8)15(3-14-5)10-7(17)6(16)4(22-10)1-21-23(18,19)20/h2-4,6-7,10,16-17H,1H2,(H2,11,12,13)(H2,18,19,20)/t4-,6-,7+,10-/m1/s1 Key: UDMBCSSLTHHNCD-UHTZMRCNSA-N; InChI=1/C10H14N5O7P/c11-8-5-9(13-2-12-8)15(3-14-5)10-7(17)6(16)4(22-10)1-21-23(18,19)20/h2-4,6-7,10,16-17H,1H2,(H2,11,12,13)(H2,18,19,20)/t4-,6-,7+,10-/m1/s1 Key: UDMBCSSLTHHNCD-UHTZMRCNBN
- SMILES: c1nc(c2c(n1)n(cn2)[C@H]3[C@H]([C@@H]([C@H](O3)COP(=O)(O)O)O)O)N

Properties
Chemical formula	C_{10}H_{14}N_{5}O_{7}P
Molar mass	347.221221
- Except where otherwise noted, data are given for materials in their standard state (at 25 °C [77 °F], 100 kPa). verify (what is ?) Infobox references

Vidarabine phosphate is an adenosine monophosphate nucleotide in which ribose is replaces by an arabinose moiety. It is the monophosphate ester of vidarabine, with antiviral and possibly antineoplastic properties. It has displayed activity against chronic hepatitis B infection.

== See also ==
- Vidarabine
