= Glucose-1-phosphate adenylyltransferase =

Class of enzymes

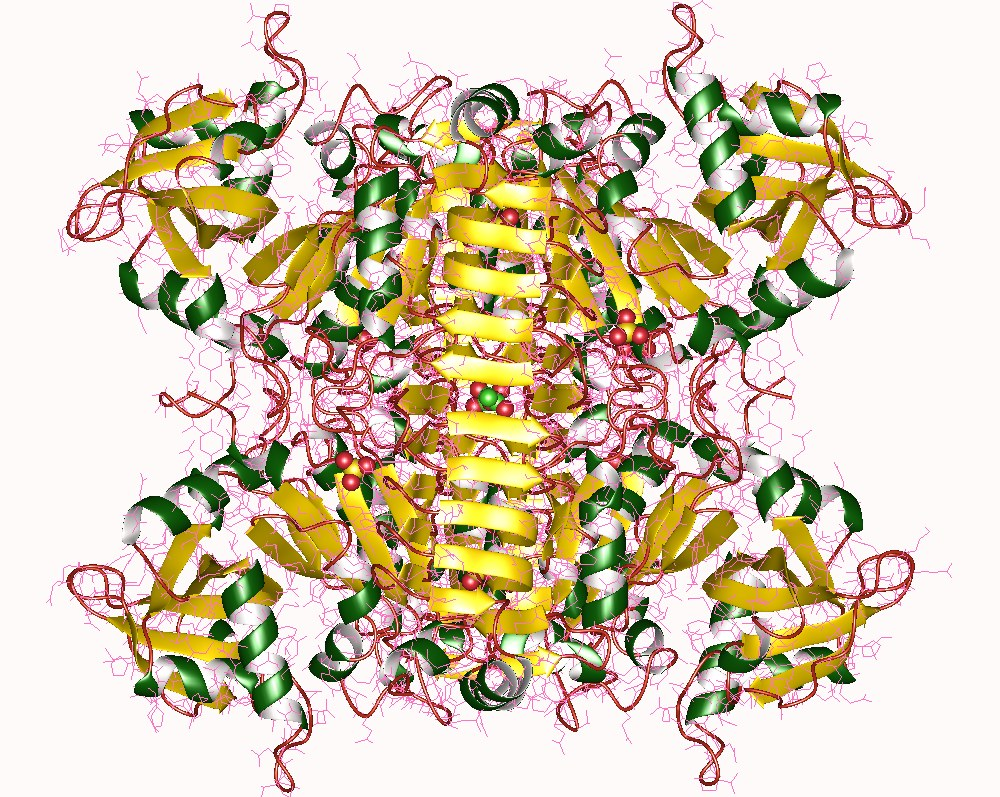
- Glucose-1-phosphate adenylyltransferase tetramer, Rhizobium radiobacter

Identifiers
- EC no.: 2.7.7.27
- CAS no.: 9027-71-8

Databases
- IntEnz: IntEnz view
- BRENDA: BRENDA entry
- ExPASy: NiceZyme view
- KEGG: KEGG entry
- MetaCyc: metabolic pathway
- PRIAM: profile
- PDB structures: RCSB PDB PDBe PDBsum
- Gene Ontology: AmiGO / QuickGO
Search
- PMC: articles
- PubMed: articles
- NCBI: proteins

Glucose-1-phosphate adenylyltransferase (EC 2.7.7.27) is an enzyme that catalyzes the chemical reaction

adenosine triphosphate
+
glucose 1-phosphate
PP_{i}
ADP-glucose

The enzyme characterised from Arthrobacter and spinach combines adenosine triphosphate and glucose 1-phosphate to give adenosine diphosphate glucose (ADP-glucose), with pyrophosphate (PP_{i}) as a byproduct.

The reaction is part of starch, sucrose, and glycogen metabolism in bacteria. The rate limiting step in their synthesis is regulated at the level of this enzyme. In many species glycolytic intermediates act to stimulate enzyme activity while adenosine monophosphate or phosphate inhibit enzyme activity. In contrast, in many animals, the synthesis of alpha 1,4 glucans (glycogen) uses UDP-glucose as a glucose donor. In this case, the regulated step is instead the glycosyl transferase.

== Nomenclature ==
This enzyme is a transferase, specifically one transferring phosphorus-containing nucleotide groups (nucleotidyltransferases). The systematic name of this enzyme class is ATP:alpha-D-glucose-1-phosphate adenylyltransferase. Other names in common use include ADP glucose pyrophosphorylase, glucose 1-phosphate adenylyltransferase, adenosine diphosphate glucose pyrophosphorylase, adenosine diphosphoglucose pyrophosphorylase, ADP-glucose pyrophosphorylase, ADP-glucose synthase, ADP-glucose synthetase, ADPG pyrophosphorylase, ADP:alpha-D-glucose-1-phosphate adenylyltransferase and AGPase.

== Structural studies ==
As of late 2007, 3 structures have been solved for this class of enzymes, with PDB accession codes PDB: 1YP2, PDB: 1YP3, and PDB: 1YP4.
