= 4-Thiouridine =

Names
- IUPAC name 4-Thiouridine
- Systematic IUPAC name 1-[(2R,3R,4S,5R)-3,4-Dihydroxy-5-(hydroxymethyl)oxolan-2-yl]-4-sulfanylidene-3,4-dihydropyrimidin-2(1H)-one

Identifiers
CAS Number	13957-31-8
3D model (JSmol)	Interactive image
ChEBI	CHEBI:20480
ChemSpider	2297547
ECHA InfoCard	100.034.291
EC Number	237-735-3
MeSH	Thiouridine
PubChem CID	3032615
UNII	U9TYQ2R33J
CompTox Dashboard (EPA)	DTXSID30930508
- InChI: InChI=1S/C9H12N2O5S/c12-3-4-6(13)7(14)8(16-4)11-2-1-5(17)10-9(11)15/h1-2,4,6-8,12-14H,3H2,(H,10,15,17)/t4-,6-,7-,8-/m1/s1 Key: ZLOIGESWDJYCTF-XVFCMESISA-N
- SMILES: C1=CN(C(=O)NC1=S)C2C(C(C(O2)CO)O)O

Properties
Chemical formula	C_{9}H_{12}N_{2}O_{5}S
Molar mass	260.26 g·mol^{−1}
- Except where otherwise noted, data are given for materials in their standard state (at 25 °C [77 °F], 100 kPa). Infobox references

4-Thiouridine is an atypical nucleoside formed with the 4-thiouracil base found in transfer RNA (tRNA). Its biosynthesis has been determined.

The IUPAC reserved the single-letter nucleobase code "S" for thiouridine in 1970, but the convention does not appear very common. "S" was repurposed to mean "C or G" in 1984.
