= 4-Thiouracil =

Names
- Preferred IUPAC name 4-Sulfanylidene-3,4-dihydropyrimidin-2(1H)-one

Identifiers
CAS Number	591-28-6
3D model (JSmol)	Interactive image
ChEMBL	ChEMBL1650608
ChemSpider	2016146
ECHA InfoCard	100.155.914
MeSH	Thiouracil
PubChem CID	2734394
CompTox Dashboard (EPA)	DTXSID50207840
- InChI: InChI=1S/C4H4N2OS/c7-4-5-2-1-3(8)6-4/h1-2H,(H2,5,6,7,8) Key: OVONXEQGWXGFJD-UHFFFAOYSA-N
- SMILES: O=C1\C=C/NC(=S)N1

Properties
Chemical formula	C_{4}H_{4}N_{2}OS
Molar mass	128.15 g·mol^{−1}
Melting point	295 °C (563 °F; 568 K) (decomp.)

Hazards
- GHS labelling
Pictograms	(GHS07: Exclamation mark)
Signal word	Warning
Hazard statements	H302, H312, H332
Precautionary statements	P261, P264, P270, P271, P280, P301+P312, P302+P352, P304+P312, P304+P340, P312, P322, P330, P363, P501
- Except where otherwise noted, data are given for materials in their standard state (at 25 °C [77 °F], 100 kPa). Infobox references

4-Thiouracil is a heterocyclic organic compound having a pyrimidine skeleton. It is a derivative of the nucleobase uracil with a sulfur instead of oxygen in position 4. It is found naturally in the 4-thiouridine nucleoside.
