= Cytidine diphosphate =

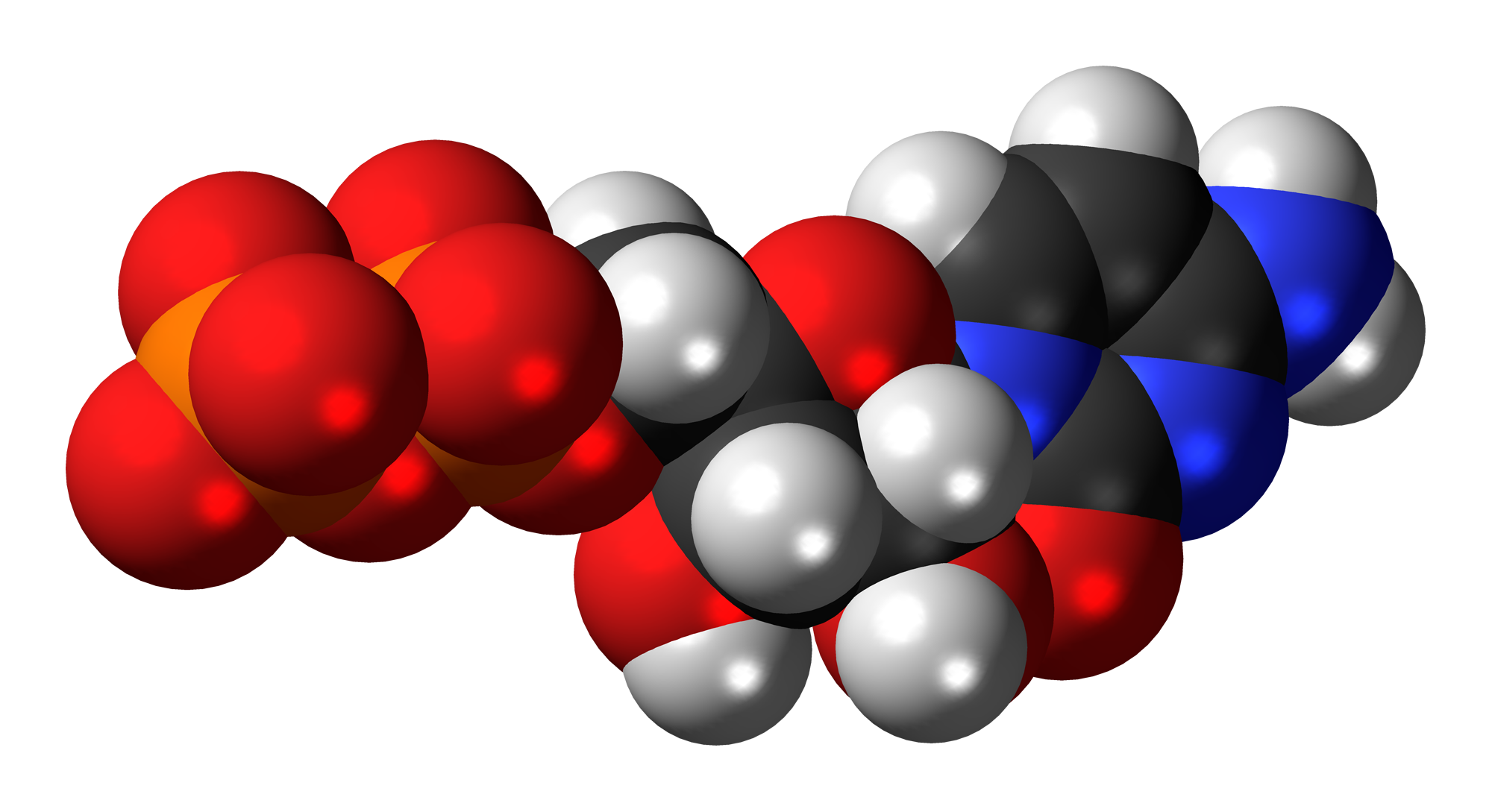

Names
- IUPAC name Cytidine 5′-(trihydrogen diphosphate)
- Systematic IUPAC name [(2R,3S,4R,5R)-5-(4-Amino-2-oxopyrimidin-1(2H)-yl)-3,4-dihydroxyoxolan-2-yl]methyl trihydrogen diphosphate

Identifiers
CAS Number	63-38-7; 54394-9-0 (disodium salt); 34393-59-4 (trisodium salt)
3D model (JSmol)	Interactive image
ChEBI	CHEBI:17239
ChEMBL	ChEMBL425252
ChemSpider	5902
DrugBank	DB04555
ECHA InfoCard	100.000.507
EC Number	200-557-1
KEGG	C00112
PubChem CID	290
UNII	1ZH821MXU5; F8B9F7OXES (disodium salt); 0TZ883O8PW (trisodium salt)
CompTox Dashboard (EPA)	DTXSID501014481
- InChI: InChI=1S/C9H15N3O11P2/c10-5-1-2-12(9(15)11-5)8-7(14)6(13)4(22-8)3-21-25(19,20)23-24(16,17)18/h1-2,4,6-8,13-14H,3H2,(H,19,20)(H2,10,11,15)(H2,16,17,18)/t4-,6-,7-,8-/m1/s1 Key: ZWIADYZPOWUWEW-XVFCMESISA-N; InChI=1/C9H15N3O11P2/c10-5-1-2-12(9(15)11-5)8-7(14)6(13)4(22-8)3-21-25(19,20)23-24(16,17)18/h1-2,4,6-8,13-14H,3H2,(H,19,20)(H2,10,11,15)(H2,16,17,18)/t4-,6-,7-,8-/m1/s1 Key: ZWIADYZPOWUWEW-XVFCMESIBF
- SMILES: O=P(O)(O)OP(=O)(O)OC[C@H]2O[C@@H](N/1C(=O)/N=C(/N)\C=C\1)[C@H](O)[C@@H]2O

Properties
Chemical formula	C_{9}H_{15}N_{3}O_{11}P_{2}
Molar mass	403.176422
- Except where otherwise noted, data are given for materials in their standard state (at 25 °C [77 °F], 100 kPa). verify (what is ?) Infobox references

Cytidine diphosphate, abbreviated CDP, is a nucleoside diphosphate. It is an ester of pyrophosphoric acid with the nucleoside cytidine. CDP consists of the pyrophosphate group, the pentose sugar ribose, and the nucleobase cytosine.

In Bacillus subtilis and Staphylococcus aureus, CDP-activated glycerol and ribitol are necessary to build wall teichoic acid.

In Rhodothermus marinus, CDP-activated inositol is necessary to form the phospholipid dialkylether glycerophosphoinositide, which contains inositol phosphate and ether-linked alkyl chains.

CDP is commonly formed in the reaction dolichol + cytidine triphosphate (CTP) ⟶ dolichol-phosphate + CDP, which is prevalent in many biochemical pathways.

== See also ==
- Nucleoside
- Nucleotide
- DNA
- RNA
- Oligonucleotide
