= Arabinofuranosylcytosine triphosphate =

Names
- IUPAC name 1-(4-Amino-2-oxopyrimidin-1(2H)-yl)-1-deoxy-β-D-arabinofuranose 5′-(tetrahydrogen triphosphate)
- Systematic IUPAC name O^{1}-{[(2R,3S,4S,5R)-5-(4-Amino-2-oxopyrimidin-1(2H)-yl)-3,4-dihydroxyoxolan-2-yl]methyl} tetrahydrogen triphosphate
- Other names Ara-CTP, Cytarabine triphosphate, Cytosine arabinoside triphosphate

Identifiers
CAS Number	13191-15-6
3D model (JSmol)	Interactive image
ChemSpider	29784777
MeSH	Arabinofuranosylcytosine+triphosphate
PubChem CID	25774
UNII	S78SFW950O
CompTox Dashboard (EPA)	DTXSID40927388
- InChI: InChI=1S/C10H18N3O13P3/c11-6-1-2-13(10(16)12-6)9-8(15)7(14)5(25-9)3-24-29(22,23)26-28(20,21)4-27(17,18)19/h1-2,5,7-9,14-15H,3-4H2,(H,20,21)(H,22,23)(H2,11,12,16)(H2,17,18,19)/t5-,7-,8+,9-/m1/s1 Key: PEZFHAVVQBLXDV-BUJSFMDZSA-N; InChI=1/C10H18N3O13P3/c11-6-1-2-13(10(16)12-6)9-8(15)7(14)5(25-9)3-24-29(22,23)26-28(20,21)4-27(17,18)19/h1-2,5,7-9,14-15H,3-4H2,(H,20,21)(H,22,23)(H2,11,12,16)(H2,17,18,19)/t5-,7-,8+,9-/m1/s1 Key: PEZFHAVVQBLXDV-BUJSFMDZBE
- SMILES: c1cn(c(=O)nc1N)[C@H]2[C@H]([C@@H]([C@H](O2)COP(=O)(O)OP(=O)(CP(=O)(O)O)O)O)O

Properties
Chemical formula	C_{9}H_{16}N_{3}O_{14}P_{3}
Molar mass	483.156323
- Except where otherwise noted, data are given for materials in their standard state (at 25 °C [77 °F], 100 kPa). verify (what is ?) Infobox references

Arabinofuranosylcytosine triphosphate is a nucleotide that inhibits the synthesis of DNA by acting as an antimetabolic agent against deoxycytidine (a component of DNA). It is the biologically active form of cytarabine.
