= S-adenosylhomocysteine deaminase =

Class of enzymes

Identifiers
- EC no.: 3.5.4.28
- CAS no.: 125149-24-8

Databases
- BRENDA: enzyme data
- ExPASy: NiceZyme view
- KEGG: enzyme entry
- MetaCyc: metabolic pathway
- Rhea: reactions
- PDB structures: RCSB PDB PDBe PDBsum
- Gene Ontology: AmiGO / QuickGO
Search
- PMC: articles
- PubMed: articles
- NCBI: proteins

S-adenosylhomocysteine deaminase (EC 3.5.4.28) is an enzyme characterised from Streptomyces flocculus that catalyzes the hydrolysis of S-adenosyl-L-homocysteine to S-inosyl-L-homocysteine and ammonia:

S-adenosyl-L-homocysteine
H_{2}O
NH_{3}
S-inosyl-L-homocysteine

Metabolic engineering of this enzyme has been studied as a means of producing cis-α-irone.

This enzyme is a hydrolase, one acting on carbon-nitrogen bonds other than peptide bonds, specifically in cyclic amidines. The systematic name of this enzyme class is S-adenosyl-L-homocysteine aminohydrolase. It is also called adenosylhomocysteine deaminase.
