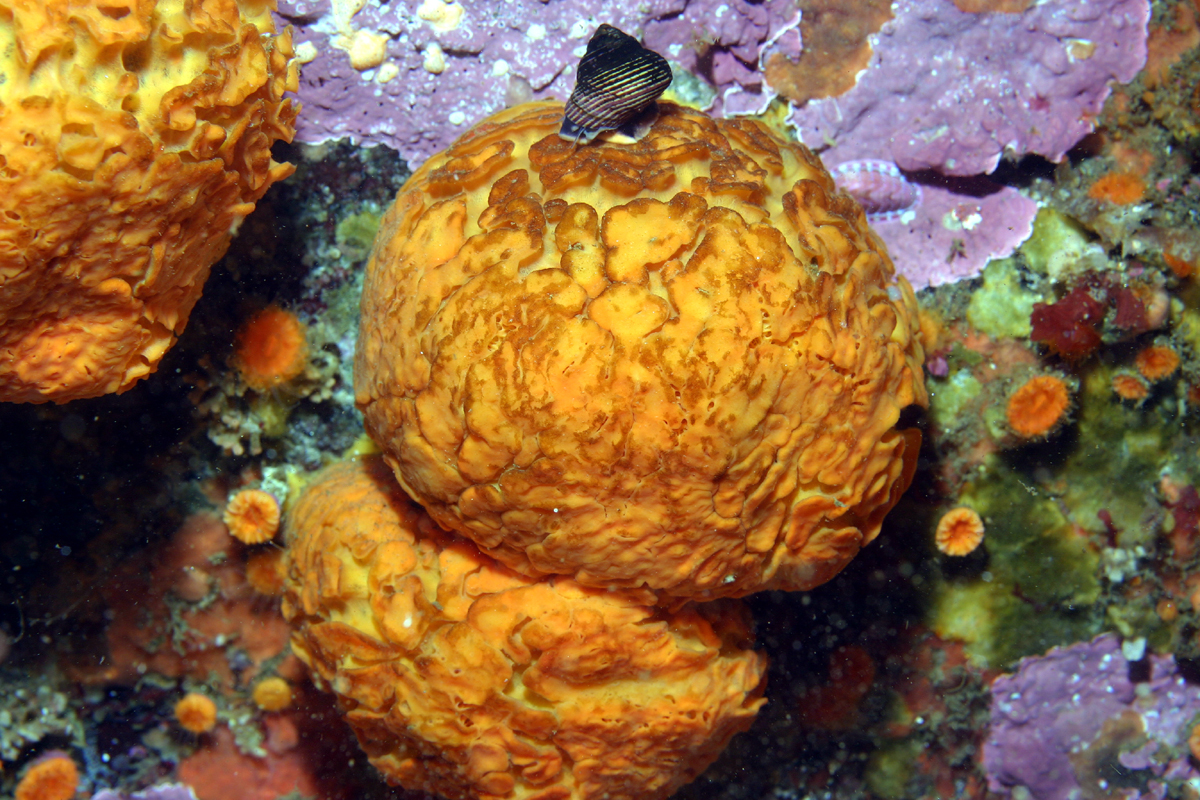
- Tethya aurantium

Scientific classification
- Kingdom: Animalia
- Phylum: Porifera
- Class: Demospongiae
- Order: Tethyida
- Family: Tethyidae; Gray, 1848

Genera
- Anthotethya; Burtonitethya; Columnitis; Halicometes; Laxotethya; Nucleotethya; Oxytethya; Stellitethya; Tectitethya; Tethya; Tethyastra; Tethycometes; Tethytimea; Xenospongia

Synonyms
- Donatiidae Burton, 1924

= Tethyidae =

Family of sponges

Tethyidae is a family of sea sponges belonging to the order Tethyida.
