= Tethyida =

Scientific classification
- Kingdom: Animalia
- Phylum: Porifera
- Class: Demospongiae
- Subclass: Heteroscleromorpha
- Order: Tethyida; Morrow & Cárdenas, 2015

Families
- Hemiasterellidae Lendenfeld, 1889; Tethyidae Gray, 1848; Timeidae Topsent, 1928

Order of sponges

Tethyida is an order of sea sponges in the subclass Heteroscleromorpha.
