= LAPTM4B =

Protein-coding gene in the species Homo sapiens

Identifiers
- Aliases: LAPTM4B, LAPTM4beta, LC27, lysosomal protein transmembrane 4 beta
- External IDs: OMIM: 613296; MGI: 1890494; HomoloGene: 10182; GeneCards: LAPTM4B; OMA:LAPTM4B - orthologs

Gene location (Human)
Chr.	Chromosome 8 (human)
Band	8q22.1	Start	97,775,057 bp
Band	8q22.1	End	97,853,013 bp

Gene location (Mouse)
Chr.	Chromosome 15 (mouse)
Band	15|15 B3.1	Start	34,238,174 bp
Band	15|15 B3.1	End	34,284,448 bp
RNA expression pattern
Bgee	Human / Mouse (ortholog); Top expressed in: retinal pigment epithelium; Epithelium of choroid plexus; right ventricle; myocardium; cardiac muscle tissue of right atrium; pancreatic ductal cell; myocardium of left ventricle; secondary oocyte; beta cell; biceps brachii / Top expressed in: motor neuron; ciliary body; Epithelium of choroid plexus; facial motor nucleus; substantia nigra; primary oocyte; Paneth cell; retinal pigment epithelium; medullary collecting duct; primitive streak; More reference expression data
BioGPS	n/a
Gene ontology
Molecular function	protein binding; kinase binding; ubiquitin protein ligase binding; phosphatidylinositol bisphosphate binding; ceramide binding
Cellular component	endomembrane system; integral component of membrane; membrane; early endosome; multivesicular body, internal vesicle; lysosome; lysosomal membrane; endosome; plasma membrane; endosome membrane; late endosome membrane; multivesicular body membrane; cell projection
Biological process	endosome organization; endosome transport via multivesicular body sorting pathway; negative regulation of lysosomal protein catabolic process; negative regulation of transforming growth factor beta1 production; regulation of lysosomal membrane permeability; regulation of lysosome organization
Sources:Amigo / QuickGO
Orthologs
Species	Human	Mouse
Entrez	55353	114128
Ensembl	ENSG00000104341	ENSMUSG00000022257
UniProt	Q86VI4	Q91XQ6
RefSeq (mRNA)	NM_018407	NM_033521
RefSeq (protein)	NP_060877	NP_277056
Location (UCSC)	Chr 8: 97.78 – 97.85 Mb	Chr 15: 34.24 – 34.28 Mb
PubMed search
- Wikidata
View/Edit Human	View/Edit Mouse

Lysosomal-associated transmembrane protein 4B is a protein that in humans is encoded by the LAPTM4B gene.

LAPTM4B protein contains a lysosome localization motif and localizes on late endosomes and lysosomes.

== Clinical significance ==
Increased expression of LAPTM4B has been found in breast, liver, lung, ovarian, uterine, gastric cancers. Elevated LAPTM4B level contributes to chemotherapy resistance in breast cancer. Overexpression of LAPTM4B causes anthracyclines (doxorubicin, daunorubicin, and epirubicin) resistance by retaining drug in the cytoplasm and decreasing nuclear localization of drug and drug induced DNA damage.

LAPTM4B also promotes autophagy, a cell survival mechanism mediated by lysosomes. LAPTM4B promotes autophagy and renders tumor cells resistant to metabolic and genotoxic stress and results in more rapid tumor growth. Based on these findings, LAPTM4B can be utilized to be a therapeutic target to prevent chemotherapy resistance or a marker to identify the patients who will not benefit from anthracyclines.

LAPTM4B mediates pro-cancer functions through epidermal growth factor receptor (EGFR), a well-known oncogene overexpressed and/or mutated in many solid tumors. In nutrient rich conditions, LAPTM4B amplifies EGFR signaling by blocking the intraluminal sorting and lysosomal degradation of activated EGFR. In stressed conditions such as nutrient deprivation, LAPTM4B alternatively sequesters inactive EGFR at an endosomal complex that contributes to autophagy upregulation, a function independent of EGFR tyrosine kinase activity. LAPTM4B selectively interacts with inactive EGFR, which is markedly promoted by serum starvation. Thus, LAPTM4B not only augments proliferative signaling, but it also increases cellular stress resistance. These studies suggest that co-targeting EGFR with LAPTM4B or autophagy might improve therapeutic response in EGFR positive cancer patients.
