= TopoTarget =

Danish biotechnology company

- Type: Public (Nasdaq Copenhagen: TOPO)
- Industry: Biotechnology
- Founded: 2000
- Headquarters: Copenhagen, Denmark
- Key people: Francois Martelet (Chief Executive Officer); Anders Fink Vadsholt (CFO & Head of IR); Bo Jesper Hansen (Chairman of the Board) Peter Buhl Jensen (co-foundar); Jean-Louis Misset (Global Medical and Scientific Advisory Board)
- Revenue: ▲DKK 43.979 million (2009)^{, p. 24}
- Operating income: ▼DKK 132.49 million (2009)^{, p. 24}
- Net income: ▼DKK 140.46 million (2009)^{, p. 24}
- Total assets: ▼DKK 585.41 million (2009)^{, p. 24}
- Total equity: ▼DKK 411.79 million (2009)^{, p. 24}
- Number of employees: ▼53 (2009)^{, pp. 24; 68 (2008)}^{, p. 36;}
- Website: http://www.topotarget.com/

TopoTarget (Nasdaq Copenhagen: TOPO) was a Copenhagen-based biotechnology company focused on the discovery and development of drugs and therapies to treat cancer. In 2014, it merged with BioAlliance Pharma and is now part of Onxeo.

It was founded in 2000 by a group of clinicians. TopoTarget was involved in collaborations with both academia and industry. In 2001 they began collaborating with the National Cancer Institute, a component of the US National Institutes of Health. Since their acquisition of Prolifix, they have been collaborating with the Netherlands Cancer Institute. They also collaborate with Rigshospitalet, the national hospital of Denmark. TopoTarget has also collaborated with other companies, including Novartis since 2003, and Lundbeck as of October 2007; Topotarget has been member of the Danish Innovation Network Biopeople since 2005.

== Company profile ==
In 2007, TopoTarget's revenue was 44,890,000 DKK. The company is publicly traded on the OMX Nordic Exchange in Copenhagen under the symbol TOPO. They are a member of Medicon Valley Alliance. The CEO is Peter Buhl Jensen, M.D., PhD

=== Personnel ===
At the end of 2007, TopoTarget had a total of 146 employees who worked in drug development (including assay development, medicinal chemistry, preclinical research, and clinical trials), marketing, and sales. About 58% of employees are in medical and research fields. TopoTarget has public partners in many areas of the world, notably at Rigshospitalet, Copenhagen, Frankfurt University Hospital, Oxford University Hospital, and the National Cancer Institute, US

=== History ===
TopoTarget was founded in 2000 by clinicians specializing in the molecular mechanisms of cancer. Since its start it has grown mostly through acquisitions of other companies. In 2002, TopoTarget acquired Prolifix Ltd. based in the United Kingdom. This was followed by the purchase of G2M Cancer Drugs AG in Germany in 2005. By 2006 TopoTarget had 125 employees specializing in most areas of drug discovery and development. In 2007, they acquired Apoxis, which has two products, APO010 and APO866. TopoTarget currently employs 146 people in Denmark, Germany, Switzerland, UK and the USA.

Currently TopoTarget has nine drugs in clinical development, as well as an extensive portfolio of small molecule drug candidates in the pre-clinical phase. Savene/Totect, TopoTarget's first marketed product was released in October 2006 in Europe and October 2007 in the United States causing a large jump in revenue from 2 million DKK in 2006 to 19 million DKK in 2007. In 2007, 293 patients were treated via drugs from TopoTarget's pipeline.

=== Collaborative research and business strategy ===
Since its inception in 2000, TopoTarget has developed a strong, two-pronged strategy for expanding its drug portfolio. TopoTarget splits its focus between in-licensing and out-licensing opportunities to maximize its utilization of available skills and resources. In-licensing takes advantage of internal talent and focuses on preclinical and early clinical development of small molecule drugs through Phase I trials. Out-licensing of its products to larger pharmaceutical companies, however, facilitates the progression of drugs with broad market potential through the final stages of clinical development, regulatory approval, and marketing by taking advantage of their established reputations and knacks for navigating the later stages of commercialization. To summarize its strategy, TopoTarget states:

The Company has a track record of successfully managing alliances with major pharmaceutical companies, biotechnology companies and academic institutions. The Company will continue this strategy in order to develop a portfolio of oncology product candidates and projects which is balanced between shorter-term niche products and longer-term products of broad potential application.

Allowing each sector to focus on its specialty in the drug development timeline maximizes TopoTarget's use of time and resources to increase productivity.

A number of in-licensing collaborations have expanded TopoTarget's drug pipeline. In June 2004, TopoTarget entered a licensing and collaboration agreement with CuraGen Corporation with respect to research, development, and commercialization of a group of small molecules that inhibit histone deacetylase (HDAC) enzymes. One of these drugs—Belinostat—has proved particularly promising and forms the basis of TopoTarget's research collaboration with the National Cancer Institute in the USA. In October 2005, Astellas sold them the exclusive worldwide license for a group of compounds with potential anti-cancer or immuno-suppressive activity which are currently undergoing further preclinical evaluation. LEO Pharma sold TopoTarget the license to its preclinical HDAC inhibitor, which is also undergoing evaluation as a treatment for cancer and inflammatory conditions. As of April 2008, all sales rights for this compound were transferred to TopoTarget. In October 2007, H Lundbeck A/S sold the development rights for their sigma receptor ligand, Siramesine. By licensing potential cancer therapeutics from external sources and developing drug candidates from within, TopoTarget hopes to establish a broad array of drugs that target the underlying molecular mechanisms of cancer.

Once the viability of a compound has been established internally, TopoTarget relays the remaining responsibilities of the development process to its commercial collaborators in out-licensing agreements. Three prominent bodies maintain such out-licensing contracts: the National Cancer Institute (USA), the Netherlands Cancer Institute, and Righospitalet (Copenhagen, Denmark). TopoTarget has been working with the Division of Cancer Treatment and Diagnosis at NCI since 2001 to develop new anti-cancer agents. Currently, NCI is handling the clinical development of TopoTarget's HDAC inhibitor Belinostat (PXD101). NCI's efforts are focused on determining the molecular basis of Belinostat's anti-cancer activity and the drug's viability in combination drug therapy. The Netherlands Cancer Institute provides TopoTarget access to the extensive research conducted by the Division of Carcinogenesis, which uses advanced techniques in functional genomics to identify novel genes with roles in carcinogenesis. May 2003 saw the establishment of a five-year research collaboration agreement between TopoTarget and Copenhagen's Rigshospitalet to test the drug Topotect for effectiveness against brain metastases. Such relationships allow TopoTarget to advance its products through clinical development where its immediate resources are insufficient for the task.

== Products ==
TopoTarget's portfolio included Belinostat, Savicol, Baceca, Avugane, APO866, TopotectA, Zemab, APO010, HSP90 Inhibitors, APO200.

=== Marketed ===
==== Savene ====
Savene (aka Totect) is TopoTarget's single marketed drug as of the end of 2008.^{, p. 14} The generic name for Savene is dexrazoxane. Savene was developed by TopoTarget and authorized to be put on the market in July 2007 by the European Commission for the treatment of anthracycline extravasation. Savene, developed by TopoTarget is used for the treatment of anthracycline extravasation, a rare complication to chemotherapy. Anthracycline extravasation is defined as the unintentional installation or leakage into the perivascular or subcutaneous spaces during administration. Savene works by inhibiting DNA topoisomerase II, which is the target of anthracycline chemotherapy. The drug binds to DNA topoisomerase II at a different step in the catalytic cycle than anthracyclines, which locks the enzyme in a conformational form that is no longer affected by anthracyclines. The drug is delivered as a ready-to-use kit containing both Savene powder and Savene diluents.^{, pp. 12–13;}

=== In clinical development ===
==== Belinostat ====
Belinostat (PXD101)^{, p. 15} is TopoTarget's lead product that is currently in late-stage clinical development for the treatment of hematological malignancies and solid tumors. Belinostat is a histone deacetylase inhibitor (HDACi). TopoTarget expects to launch an initial regulatory study using Belinostat as monotherapy to treat peripheral T-cell lymphoma (PTCL) by the beginning of 2009. In October 2007 preliminary results were released from the Phase II clinical trial of intravenous belinostat in combination with carboplatin and paclitaxel for relapsed ovarian cancer. Final results in late 2009 of a phase II trial for T cell lymphoma were encouraging. Belinostat has been granted orphan drug and fast track designation by the FDA. As of September 2010, belinostat is in a phase II pivotal trial with NDA submission planned for 2011H2.

==== Savicol ====
Savicol, formerly known as PEAC (Pulse Enhanced ACetylation), is an anti-cancer drug candidate that treats familial adenomatous polyposis (FAP). Savicol delivers valproic acid as a proprietary, which builds up on a specific pharmacokinetic release pattern that is projected to inhibit certain HDAC enzymes in a more efficient manner. Savicol has been entered into Phase II studies by TopoTarget for the treatment of colorectal polyps in FAP patients. Orphan drug status has been granted to Savicol in both the United States and in Europe.

==== Baceca ====
Baceca comprises a topical formulation of valproic acid (VPA) for the treatment of hyperproliferative skin diseases, including basal cell carcinoma and pre-cancerous actinic keratosis. VPA primarily targets HDAC class I enzymes that are involved in cell proliferation and tumorigenesis. Baceca is currently in Phase II clinical trials.

==== Avugane ====
Avugane is a novel proprietary formulation of the HDACi VPA that has the potential to be used as a topical treatment of inflammatory skin diseases including common acne. Randomized Phase II clinical studies were performed with Avugane in April 2006 and further studies have been conducted since then to investigate the clinical utility of the drug. If the results are successful, TopoTarget may consider conduction trials on other diseases including psoriasis and atopic dermatitis.

==== TopotectA ====
TopotectA is a topoisomerase II inhibitor for the treatment of brain metastases. This drug is based on the same compound as Savene (dexrazoxane) and is currently involved in Phase I clinical trials for the treatment of brain metastases, which are a common secondary condition to patients that have lung cancer and breast cancer.

==== Zemab ====
Zemab comprises an antibody-toxin for the treatment of specific types of cancers in the form of a protein product.^{, pg 20} The recombinant protein product targets the ErbB2/HER2 receptor, which is overexpressed in 30% of breast cancer and is often a marker of a more aggressive disease. This receptor is also believed to be involved in certain other cancers, including head and neck cancers. The next clinical studies of Zemab were expected to be initiated by the start of 2009. but As of October 2010 no clinical trials were registered.

==== APO010 ====
APO010, also known as mega-FasLigand, is a recombinant fusion protein. This protein was derived from the pro-apoptotic human Fas ligand (FasL) protein. APO010 causes cell death of cancerous cells through a mechanism of targeting Fas receptors on the surface of cancer cells inducing cell apoptosis. A Phase I study is currently being conducted with APO010 on patients with untreatable, advanced or refractory solid tumors.

==== APO866 ====
APO866, a drug that inhibits the growth of human tumors, is a potent and specific inhibitor of a key enzyme that is involved in the synthesis of NAD, called NMPRT. The worldwide development and marketing rights to APO866 were acquired from Astellas in October 2005. APO866 is a drug that provides a new therapeutic approach to cancer. TopoTarget has opened three separate clinical studies of APO866 :

1. to assess APO866 as a treatment of advanced melanoma,
2. to assess APO866 as a treatment of cutaneous T-cell lymphoma (CTL)
3. to assess APO866 as a treatment of refractory or relapsed B-chronic lymphocytic leukemia.

The CTL trial was terminated in 2016 at the interim review point due to lack of efficacy.

=== Pre-clinical development ===
==== APO200 ====
APO200 is a therapeutic recombinant protein that is developed from the ectodysplasin A-1 (EDA1) gene. This product is used to treat a rare human genetic disease linked with mutations in the EDA1 gene. The disease reduces a patient's ability to sweat and increases hypersensitivity to heat, aberrant dentition, hairlessness, and dry skin. Completed pre-clinical development has shown the potential of APO200 in animal models of X-Linked Hypohidrotic Ectodermal Dysplasia (XLHED). APO200 gained orphan drug status from the FDA in February 2006. TopoTarget plans to sell this project to another company or to out-license it.

==== HSP90 inhibitors ====
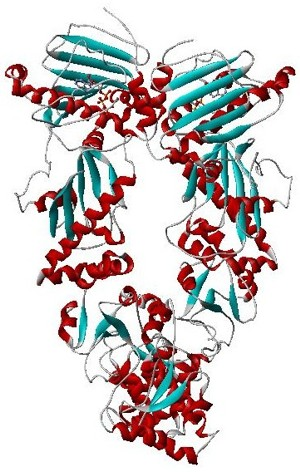
Heat shock proteins are vital to eukaryotic cell function and are among the most highly expressed proteins in all species. HSP90 facilitates protein folding, cell signaling, and tumor repression. Inhibition of HSP90 interferes with the PI3K/AKT pathway, initiating apoptosis, making HSP90 inhibitors attractive prospects for cancer treatment.

A number of heat shock protein 90 (HSP90) small molecule inhibitors have been developed by TopoTarget, with several compounds showing high potency in several cancer cell lines, particularly those cell lines which over-express HER2 receptors. This project is still in pre-clinical trials and TopoTarget is in the process of out-licensing the product or looking for companies to collaborate with on the project.

== Future perspectives ==
=== Research ===
TopoTarget has several drugs in preclinical development. A current target is Heat Shock Protein 90 (HSP90). HSP90 is key in protein folding and maturation. TopoTarget is currently looking for small molecule drugs that inhibit HSP90 function to induce apoptosis. Current molecules have shown great promise and are undergoing optimization and evaluation in order to obtain a patent. TopoTarget is also studying the mechanism of action behind the mTOR (mammalian target of rapamycin) pathway to understand targets for anti-tumor drugs. Currently they are looking to find a lead compound in order to continue these studies. TopoTarget is also looking into more drugs that interrupt HDAC activity, not only for cancer therapy, but for diseases like malaria and CNS disorders.
