= Peucemycin =

Identifiers
3D model (JSmol)	Interactive image
- InChI: InChI=1S/C24H30O6/c1-4-7-9-19-21(26)13-18-14-22(27)29-15-17(12-16(6-3)8-5-2)10-11-20(25)23(28)24(19)30-18/h7-13,20,23,25,28H,4-6,14-15H2,1-3H3/b9-7+,11-10+,16-8+,17-12- Key: MCGPXTDENHMOKQ-WQQCRNHGSA-N
- SMILES: CC\C=C\C1=C2OC(CC(=O)OC/C(=C\C(\CC)=C\CC)/C=C/C(O)C2O)=CC1=O

Properties
Chemical formula	C_{24}H_{30}O_{6}
Molar mass	414.498 g·mol^{−1}
- Except where otherwise noted, data are given for materials in their standard state (at 25 °C [77 °F], 100 kPa). Infobox references

Peucemycin is a polyketide produced by Streptomyces peucetius, a Gram-positive filamentous bacteria that also produces the anticancer compounds daunorubicin and doxorubicin. This compound was elucidated from a cryptic biosynthetic gene cluster and is produced under temperature-specific conditions for bacterial growth (metabolite is present at 18 °C but not 28 °C). Peucemycin has demonstrated bioactivity against growth of S. aureus, P. hauseri, and S. enterica and also is weakly active against cancer cell lines. Peucemycin is biosynthesized through a Type 1 PKS system.

== Biosynthesis ==
Peucemycin is synthesized through a type 1 polyketide synthase with 8 proposed modules from 5 PKS-related genes (peuA-peuE). The type 1 PKS pathway used for biosynthesis is shown in Figure 1. The first gene, peuA, encodes for an initiation module and two elongation modules. The structure of the ketosynthase enzyme in the initiation module has a mutation of a cysteine residue to a glutamine residue that allows for decarboxylation of the starting material without condensation. The next gene, peuB, encodes for modules 3 and 4. Sequencing data of Module 4 indicates presence of a dehydratase enzyme, but amino acid mutations leave this enzyme inactivated, meaning a singular hydroxyl group at carbon 9 is generated. Module 5 is encoded by peuC, and an additional gene, peuI, is proposed to introduce the butyl malonyl-CoA in this module. Modules 6 and 7 are encoded by peuD and peuE respectively. The forming polyketide chain is hydroxylated with cytochrome P450 enzymes, peuH and peuG, and the terminal thioesterase domain in Module 7 catalyzes the product release and macrocycle formation to form peucemycin.

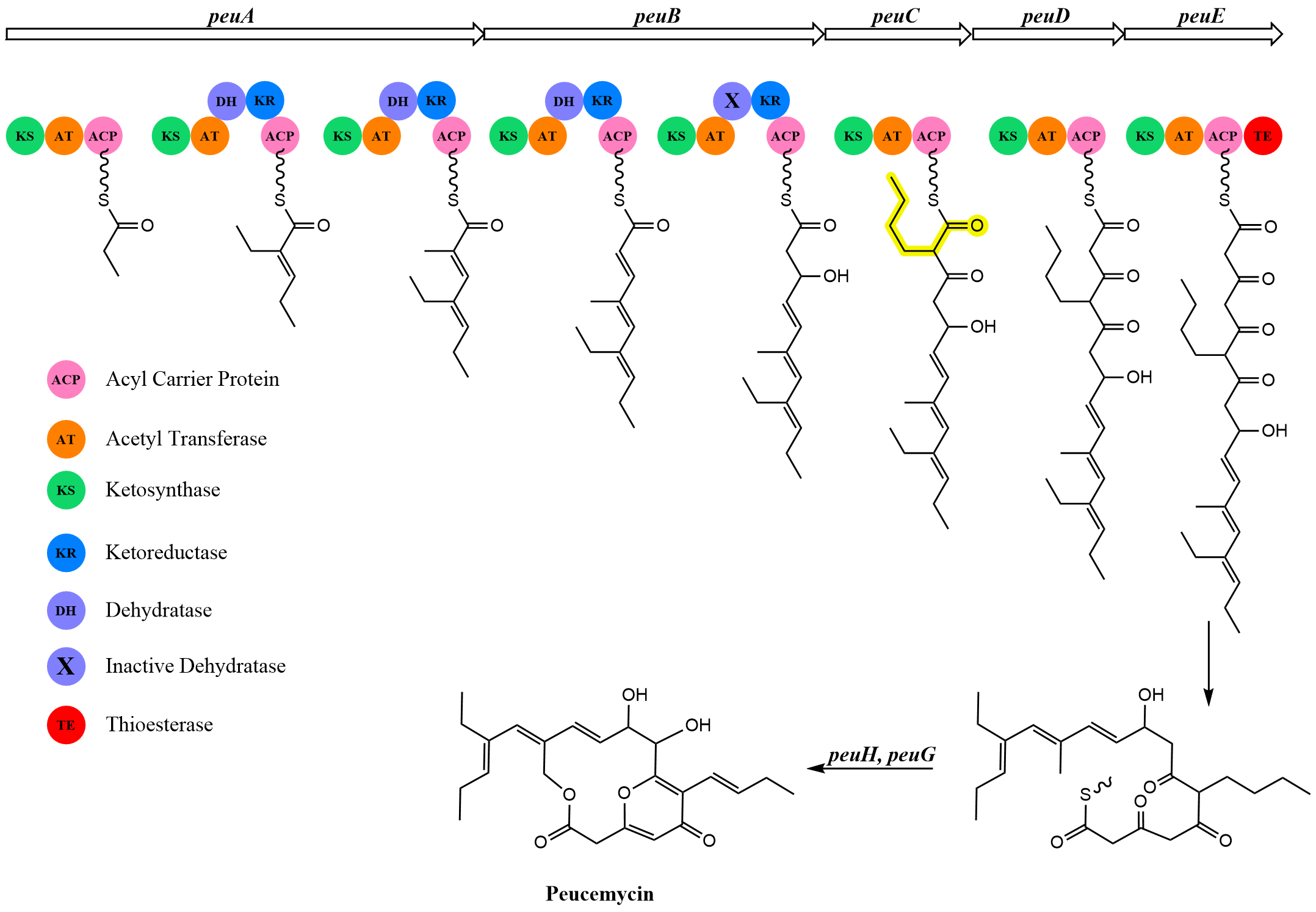
Figure 1. Biosynthesis of Peucemycin via Type 1 PKS system. Enzymes are shown in colored circles and butyl malonyl-CoA moeity introduced by peuI is highlighted in yellow.
