= PEAC =

PEAC is an abbreviation that may refer to:

- Pacific East Asia Cargo Airlines, as an unofficial abbreviation for a Philippine airline
- Pathobiology of Early Arthritis Cohort (PEAC), an MRC funded arthritis study
- Private Education Assistance Committee, sole trustee of the Fund for Assistance to Private Education
- Daskalakis Athletic Center, as a former name for this facility, "PEAC" or "Physical Education and Athletic Center"
- Savicol, as a former name for this drug, "PEAC" or "Pulse Enhanced ACetylation"
