= Cosmomycin B =

Identifiers
- IUPAC name: (9R,10R)-10-[(2S,4S,5S,6S)-4-(dimethylamino)-5-[(2S,4S,5S,6S)-4-hydroxy-5-[(2S,5S,6S)-5-hydroxy-6-methyloxan-2-yl]oxy-6-methyloxan-2-yl]oxy-6-methyloxan-2-yl]oxy-9-ethyl-4,6,9,11-tetrahydroxy-8,10-dihydro-7H-tetracene-5,12-dione
- CAS Number: 77517-27-2
- PubChem CID: 156935
- ChemSpider: 138140
- UNII: VFY8ZMN4RJ
- ChEBI: CHEBI:205917
- CompTox Dashboard (EPA): DTXSID80228220

Chemical and physical data
- Formula: C_{40}H_{53}NO_{14}
- Molar mass: 771.8 g·mol^{−1}
- 3D model (JSmol): Interactive image
- SMILES: CC[C@]1(CCC2=C([C@H]1O[C@H]3C[C@@H]([C@@H]([C@@H](O3)C)O[C@H]4C[C@@H]([C@@H]([C@@H](O4)C)O[C@H]5CC[C@@H]([C@@H](O5)C)O)O)N(C)C)C(=C6C(=C2O)C(=O)C7=C(C6=O)C=CC=C7O)O)O
- InChI: InChI=InChI=1S/C40H53NO14/c1-7-40(49)14-13-21-30(36(48)32-31(34(21)46)35(47)29-20(33(32)45)9-8-10-24(29)43)39(40)55-27-15-22(41(5)6)37(18(3)51-27)54-28-16-25(44)38(19(4)52-28)53-26-12-11-23(42)17(2)50-26/h8-10,17-19,22-23,25-28,37-39,42-44,46,48-49H,7,11-16H2,1-6H3/t17-,18-,19-,22-,23-,25-,26-,27-,28-,37+,38+,39+,40+/m0/s1; Key:MYQIMJTUIOIEOX-LVWNLLCFSA-N

Cosmomycin B is an anthracycline antibiotic.
