= Streptomyces coeruleorubidus =

Scientific classification
- Domain: Bacteria
- Kingdom: Bacillati
- Phylum: Actinomycetota
- Class: Actinomycetes
- Order: Streptomycetales
- Family: Streptomycetaceae
- Genus: Streptomyces
- Species: S. coeruleorubidus

Binomial name
- Streptomyces coeruleorubidus (Preobrazhenskaya 1957) Pridham et al. 1958 (Approved Lists 1980)

Type strain
- AS 4.1678, ATCC 13740, ATCC 23900, BCRC 11463, CBS 796.68, CCRC 11463, CGMCC 4.1678, DSM 40145, ETH 24205, Gause12531/54, IFO 12855, IMET 42060, INA 12531/54, ISP 5145, JCM 4359, KCC S-0359, KCCS-0359, KCTC 1743, KCTC 1922, NBIMCC 1152, NBRC 12855, NCIB 9620, NCIMB 9620, NCIMB 9833, NRRL B-2569, NRRL-ISP 5145, PSA 181, RIA 1132, VKM Ac-576, Waksman 3840

Synonyms
- "Actinomyces coeruleorubidus" Preobrazhenskaya 1957

Species of bacterium

Streptomyces coeruleorubidus is a bacterium species from the genus of Streptomyces which has been isolated from marine sediment. Streptomyces coeruleorubidus produces the following medications: pacidamycin 1, baumycin B1, baumycin B2, baumycin C1, feudomycin A, feudomycin B, feudomycin C, ficellomycin, feudomycinone A, and rubomycin.

== See also ==
- List of Streptomyces species
