= Streptomyces peucetius =

Scientific classification
- Domain: Bacteria
- Kingdom: Bacillati
- Phylum: Actinomycetota
- Class: Actinomycetes
- Order: Streptomycetales
- Family: Streptomycetaceae
- Genus: Streptomyces
- Species: S. peucetius

Binomial name
- Streptomyces peucetius Grein et al. 1963

Subspecies
- Streptomyces peucetius var. caesius Streptomyces peucetius ATCC 27952

Species of bacterium

Streptomyces peucetius is a bacterium species in the genus Streptomyces.

S. peucetius produces the anthracycline antitumor antibiotics daunorubicin and doxorubicin (also known as adriamycin). Recent work has identified an antibacterial macrolide, peucemycin, with activity against growth of S. aureus, P. hauseri, and S. enterica.
