= Dopamine (medication) =

Hormone used as a medication

- Skeletal formula of dopamine

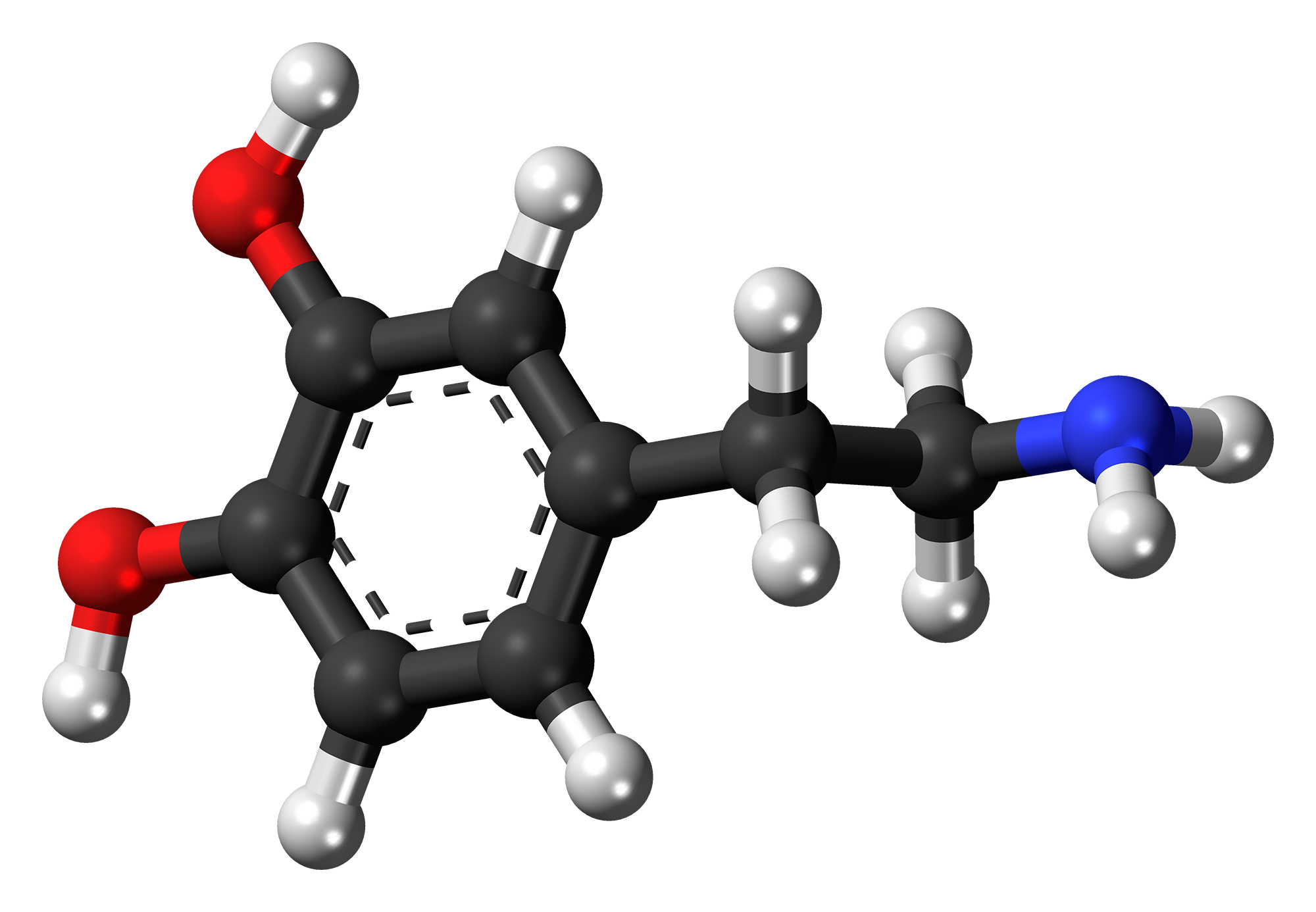
- Ball-and-stick model of the zwitterionic form of dopamine found in the crystal structure

Clinical data
- Trade names: Intropin, Dopastat, Revimine, others
- Other names: 2-(3,4-Dihydroxyphenyl)ethylamine; 3,4-Dihydroxyphenethylamine; 3-hydroxytyramine; DA; Intropin; Revivan; Oxytyramine; Prolactin inhibiting factor; Prolactin inhibiting hormone
- AHFS/Drugs.com: Monograph
- Routes of administration: Intravenous
- ATC code: C01CA04 (WHO)

Physiological data
- Source tissues: Substantia nigra; ventral tegmental area; many others
- Target tissues: System-wide
- Receptors: D_{1}, D_{2}, D_{3}, D_{4}, D_{5}, TAAR1
- Agonists: Direct: apomorphine, bromocriptine Indirect: cocaine, substituted amphetamine, cathinone, bupropion
- Antagonists: Neuroleptics, metoclopramide, domperidone
- Metabolism: MAO, COMT, ALDH, DBH, MAO-A, MAO-B, COMT

Legal status
- Legal status: EU: Rx-only; In general: ℞ (Prescription only)

Pharmacokinetic data
- Metabolism: MAO, COMT, ALDH, DBH, MAO-A, MAO-B, COMT
- Excretion: Kidney

Identifiers
- IUPAC name: 4-(2-Aminoethyl)benzene-1,2-diol
- CAS Number: 51-61-6 62-31-7 (hydrochloride)
- PubChem CID: 681
- IUPHAR/BPS: 940
- DrugBank: DB00988
- ChemSpider: 661
- UNII: VTD58H1Z2X
- KEGG: D07870
- ChEBI: CHEBI:18243
- ChEMBL: ChEMBL59

Chemical and physical data
- Formula: C_{8}H_{11}NO_{2}
- Molar mass: 153.181 g·mol^{−1}
- 3D model (JSmol): Interactive image
- Density: 1.26 g/cm^{3}
- Melting point: 128 °C (262 °F)
- Boiling point: decomposes
- SMILES: c1cc(c(cc1CCN)O)O
- InChI: InChI=1S/C8H11NO2/c9-4-3-6-1-2-7(10)8(11)5-6/h1-2,5,10-11H,3-4,9H2; Key:VYFYYTLLBUKUHU-UHFFFAOYSA-N

Dopamine, sold under the brand name Intropin among others, is a medication most commonly used in the treatment of very low blood pressure, a slow heart rate that is causing symptoms, and, if epinephrine is not available, cardiac arrest. In newborn babies it continues to be the preferred treatment for very low blood pressure. In children epinephrine or norepinephrine is generally preferred while in adults norepinephrine is generally preferred for very low blood pressure. It is given intravenously or intraosseously as a continuous infusion. Effects typically begin within five minutes. Doses are then increased to effect.

Common side effects include worsening kidney function, an irregular heartbeat, chest pain, vomiting, headache, or anxiety. If it enters into the soft tissue around the vein local tissue death may occur. The medication phentolamine can be given to try to decrease this risk. It is unclear if dopamine is safe to use during pregnancy or breastfeeding. At low doses dopamine mainly triggers dopamine receptors and β1-adrenergic receptors while at high doses it works via α-adrenergic receptors.

Dopamine was first synthesized in a laboratory in 1910 by George Barger and James Ewens in England. It is on the World Health Organization's List of Essential Medicines. In human physiology dopamine is a neurotransmitter as well as a hormone.

== Medical uses ==
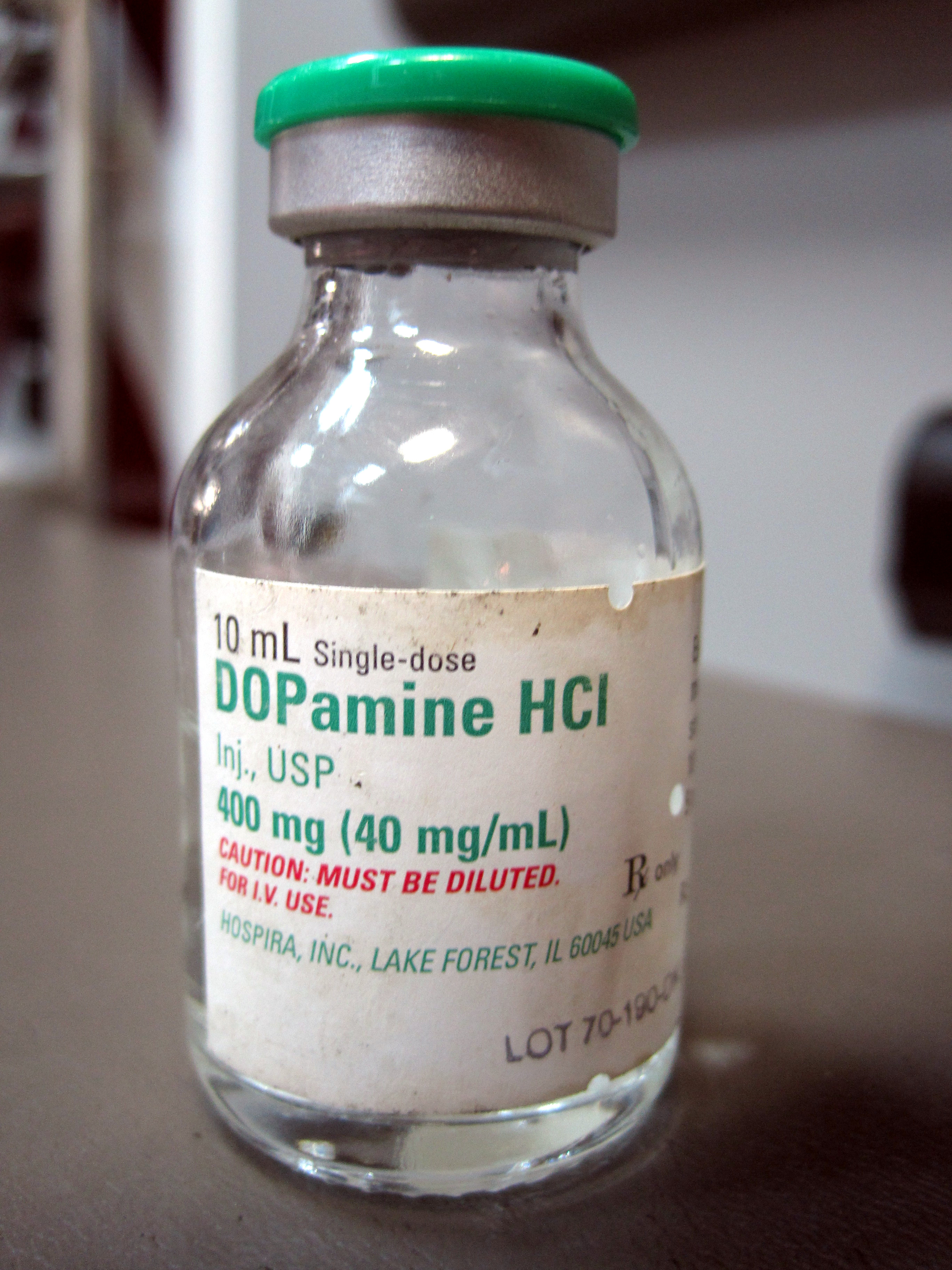
Vial of dopamine for injection

=== Low blood pressure ===
In newborn babies it continues to be the preferred treatment for very low blood pressure. In children epinephrine or norepinephrine is generally preferred while in adults norepinephrine is generally preferred for very low blood pressure.

In those with low blood volume or septic shock, this should be corrected with intravenous fluids before dopamine is considered.

=== Kidney function ===
Low-dosage dopamine has been routinely used for the treatment and prevention of acute kidney injury. However, since 1999 a number of reviews have concluded that doses at such low levels are not effective and may sometimes be harmful.

=== Administration ===
Since the half-life of dopamine in plasma is short—approximately one minute in adults, two minutes in newborn babies and up to five minutes in preterm babies—it is usually given as a continuous intravenous drip rather than a single injection.

=== Other ===
A fluorinated form of L-DOPA known as fluorodopa is available for use in positron emission tomography to assess the function of the nigrostriatal pathway.

== Contraindications ==
Dopamine should generally not be given to people who have a pheochromocytoma or uncorrected very fast heart rate.

== Side effects ==
The LD_{50}, or dose which is expected to prove lethal in 50% of the population, has been found to be: 59 mg/kg (mouse; administered intravenously); 950 mg/kg (mouse; administered intraperitoneally); 163 mg/kg (rat; administered intraperitoneally); 79 mg/kg (dog; administered intravenously).

=== Extravasation ===
If extravasation occurs local tissue death may result. The medication phentolamine can be injected at the site to try to decrease the risk of tissue death.

== Mechanism of action ==
Its effects, depending on dosage, include an increase in sodium excretion by the kidneys, an increase in urine output, an increase in heart rate, and an increase in blood pressure. At low doses it acts through the sympathetic nervous system to increase heart muscle contraction force and heart rate, thereby increasing cardiac output and blood pressure. Higher doses also cause vasoconstriction that further increases blood pressure.

While some effects result from stimulation of dopamine receptors, the prominent cardiovascular effects result from dopamine acting at α_{1}, β_{1}, and β_{2} adrenergic receptors.

== Society and culture ==
=== Legal status ===
In March 2024, the Committee for Medicinal Products for Human Use (CHMP) of the European Medicines Agency (EMA) adopted a positive opinion, recommending the granting of a pediatric use marketing authorization (PUMA) for the medicinal product Neoatricon, intended for treatment of hypotension in neonates, infants and children under 18 years of age. The applicant for this medicinal product is BrePco Biopharma Limited.
