= Streptomyces capoamus =

Scientific classification
- Domain: Bacteria
- Kingdom: Bacillati
- Phylum: Actinomycetota
- Class: Actinomycetia
- Order: Streptomycetales
- Family: Streptomycetaceae
- Genus: Streptomyces
- Species: S. capoamus

Binomial name
- Streptomyces capoamus Gonçalves de Lima et al. 1964

Type strain
- AIC 1372, AS 4.1696, ATCC 19006, BCRC 11860, CBS 712.72, CCRC 11860, CGMCC 4.1696, DSM 40494, IAUR 3122, IFO 13411, ISP 5494, JCM 4253, JCM 4734, KCC S-0253, NBRC 13411, NRRL B-3632, NRRL-ISP 5494, RIA 1372

Species of bacterium

Streptomyces capoamus is a bacterium species from the genus of Streptomyces which has been isolated from soil from Iceland. Streptomyces capoamus produces capomycin, ciclamycin O, ciclamycin 4, anthracycline, ciclacidin A, ciclacidin B and ciclamicin.

== See also ==
- List of Streptomyces species
