= Liposomal daunorubicin =

Liposomal daunorubicin (trade name DaunoXome) is a chemotherapy drug that is FDA approved to treat AIDS related Kaposi's sarcoma. It is also commonly used to treat specific types of leukaemia and non-Hodgkin lymphoma. Liposomal daunorubicin is intravenously administered. It utilizes the liposomal carrier system that provides a favorable pharmacokinetic profile at the site of KS lesions resulting in a 10-fold increase in concentrations compared to that which is achieved with conventional preparations.

== See also ==
- Daunorubicin
