= Capomycin =

Names
- IUPAC name [6-(4a,8,12b-trihydroxy-3-methyl-1,7,12-trioxo-4H-benzo[a]anthracen-9-yl)-4-hydroxy-2-methyloxan-3-yl] (2E,4E)-deca-2,4-dienoate
- Other names: Capoamycin; Antibiotic AC 54

Identifiers
CAS Number	97937-29-6
3D model (JSmol)	Interactive image
ChemSpider	88297340
PubChem CID	6438788
RTECS number	HD3510800
- InChI: InChI=1S/C35H38O10/c1-4-5-6-7-8-9-10-11-27(38)45-33-20(3)44-25(17-24(33)36)21-12-13-22-28(30(21)39)31(40)23-14-15-34(42)18-19(2)16-26(37)35(34,43)29(23)32(22)41/h8-16,20,24-25,33,36,39,42-43H,4-7,17-18H2,1-3H3/b9-8+,11-10+ Key: MCNOFFKXBMHLAD-BNFZFUHLSA-N
- SMILES: CCCCC/C=C/C=C/C(=O)OC1C(OC(CC1O)C2=C(C3=C(C=C2)C(=O)C4=C(C3=O)C=CC5(C4(C(=O)C=C(C5)C)O)O)O)C

Properties
Chemical formula	C_{35}H_{38}O_{10}
Molar mass	618.679 g·mol^{−1}
- Except where otherwise noted, data are given for materials in their standard state (at 25 °C [77 °F], 100 kPa). Infobox references

Capomycin is an antitumor antibiotic with the molecular formula C_{35}H_{38}O_{10} which is produced by the bacterium Streptomyces capoamus.
