= Dexrazoxane =

Chemical compound

Clinical data
- Trade names: Zinecard, others
- AHFS/Drugs.com: Monograph
- MedlinePlus: a609010
- License data: US DailyMed: Dexrazoxane
- Routes of administration: Intravenous
- ATC code: V03AF02 (WHO)

Legal status
- Legal status: AU: S4 (Prescription only); US: ℞-only; EU: Rx-only

Identifiers
- IUPAC name: 4-[(2S)-2-(3,5-Dioxopiperazin-1-yl)propyl]piperazine-2,6-dione
- CAS Number: 24584-09-6
- PubChem CID: 71384
- IUPHAR/BPS: 7330
- DrugBank: DB00380
- ChemSpider: 64479
- UNII: 048L81261F
- KEGG: D03730; as HCl: D07807
- ChEBI: CHEBI:50223
- ChEMBL: ChEMBL1738
- CompTox Dashboard (EPA): DTXSID3040647
- ECHA InfoCard: 100.163.459

Chemical and physical data
- Formula: C_{11}H_{16}N_{4}O_{4}
- Molar mass: 268.273 g·mol^{−1}
- 3D model (JSmol): Interactive image
- SMILES: O=C2NC(=O)CN(C[C@@H](N1CC(=O)NC(=O)C1)C)C2
- InChI: InChI=1S/C11H16N4O4/c1-7(15-5-10(18)13-11(19)6-15)2-14-3-8(16)12-9(17)4-14/h7H,2-6H2,1H3,(H,12,16,17)(H,13,18,19)/t7-/m0/s1; Key:BMKDZUISNHGIBY-ZETCQYMHSA-N

Dexrazoxane hydrochloride, sold under the brand name Zinecard among others, is a cardioprotective agent. It was discovered in 1972. The IV administration of dexrazoxane is in acidic condition with HCl adjusting the pH.

== Medical uses ==
Dexrazoxane has been used to protect the heart against the cardiotoxic side effects of chemotherapeutic drugs such as anthracyclines, such as daunorubicin or doxorubicin or other chemotherapeutic agents. However, in July 2011 the European Medicines Agency (EMA) released a statement restricting use only in adult patients with cancer who have received > 300 mg/m^{2} doxorubicin or > 540 mg/m^{2} epirubicin and general approval for use for cardioprotection. That showed a possibly higher rate of secondary malignancies and acute myelogenous leukemia in pediatric patients treated for different cancers with both dexrazoxane and other chemotherapeutic agents that are associated with secondary malignancies. On 19 July 2017, based on evaluation of the currently available data the European Commission issued an EU-wide legally binding decision to implement the recommendations of the Committee for Medicinal Products for Human Use (CHMP) on dexrazoxane and lifted its 2011-contraindication for primary prevention of anthracycline-induced cardiotoxicity with dexrazoxane in children and adolescents where high doses (≥ 300 mg/m^{3}) of anthracyclines are anticipated.

Dexrazoxane was designated by the US FDA as an orphan drug for "prevention of cardiomyopathy for children and adults 0 through 16 years of age treated with anthracyclines". This decision allows virtually all children to receive dexrazoxane starting with the first dose of anthracycline at the discretion of the treating provider. The label change by the agency announcing dexrazoxane as an approved cardio-oncology protectant has been followed by a review by the agency. Currently, the only FDA and EMA approved cardioprotective treatment for anthracycline cardioprotection is dexrazoxane, which provides effective primary cardioprotection against anthracycline-induced cardiotoxicity without reducing anthracycline activity and without enhancing secondary malignancies.

The United States Food and Drug Administration has also approved a dexrazoxane for use as a treatment of extravasation resulting from IV anthracycline chemotherapy. Extravasation is an adverse event in which chemotherapies containing anthracylines leak out of the blood vessel and necrotize the surrounding tissue.

== Mechanism ==
As a derivative of EDTA, dexrazoxane chelates iron and thus reduces the number of metal ions complexed with anthracycline and, consequently, decrease the formation of superoxide radicals. The exact chelation mechanism is unknown, but it has been postulated that dexrazoxane can be converted into ring-opened form intracellularly and interfere with iron-mediated free radical generation that is in part thought to be responsible for anthracycline induced cardiomyopathy. It was speculated that dexrazoxane could be used for further investigation to synthesize new antimalarial drugs.
