= Racepinefrine =

Chemical compound

Clinical data
- Trade names: AsthmaNefrin, Dey-Dose, Micronefrin, Nephron, S-2 Inhalant, Vaponefrin, Vaponephrin
- Other names: Racepinephrine; Racemic epinephrine; Racemic adrenaline; DL-Epinephrine; DL-Adrenaline; dl-Epinephrine; dl-Adrenaline; (±)-Epinephrine; (±)-Adrenaline

Identifiers
- IUPAC name: 4-[1-hydroxy-2-(methylamino)ethyl]benzene-1,2-diol
- CAS Number: 329-65-7
- PubChem CID: 838
- DrugBank: DB11124
- ChemSpider: 815
- UNII: GR0L9S3J0F
- KEGG: D05688
- ChEBI: CHEBI:194548
- ChEMBL: ChEMBL1740

Chemical and physical data
- Formula: C_{9}H_{13}NO_{3}
- Molar mass: 183.207 g·mol^{−1}
- 3D model (JSmol): Interactive image
- SMILES: CNCC(C1=CC(=C(C=C1)O)O)O
- InChI: InChI=1S/C9H13NO3/c1-10-5-9(13)6-2-3-7(11)8(12)4-6/h2-4,9-13H,5H2,1H3; Key:UCTWMZQNUQWSLP-UHFFFAOYSA-N

Racepinefrine (INN, USAN), or racepinephrine, sold under the brand name Vaponefrin among others, is a sympathomimetic medication described as a vasoconstrictor, bronchodilator, cardiostimulant, mydriatic, and antiglaucoma agent. It is the racemic form of epinephrine (adrenaline) and is also known as dl-epinephrine and (±)-epinephrine. The drug is used pharmaceutically as the hydrochloride salt. It has been marketed in the United States and Canada.
