= Norepinephrine (medication) =

Therapeutic use of norepinephrine

- Skeletal formula of noradrenaline

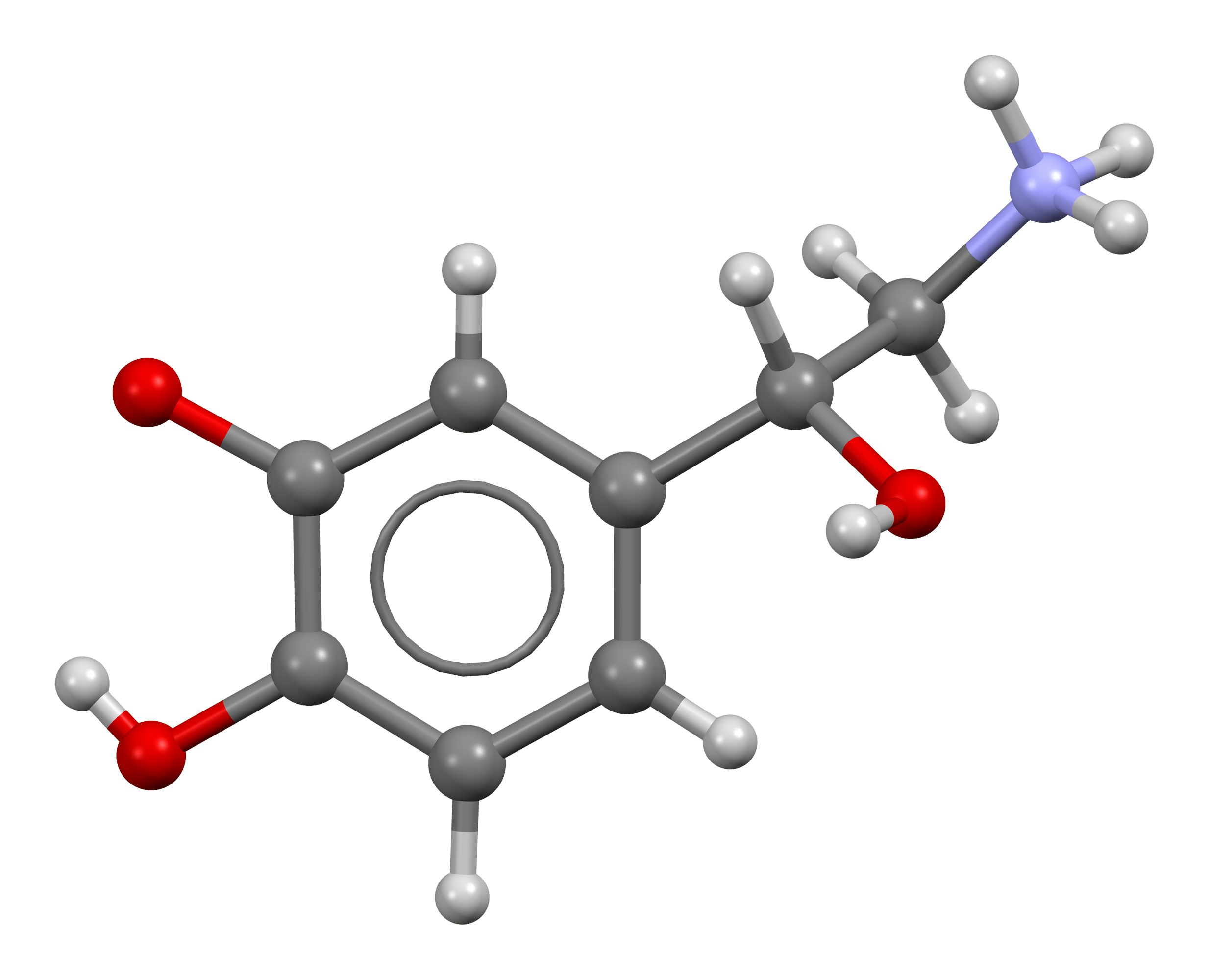
- Ball-and-stick model of the zwitterionic form of noradrenaline found in the crystal structure

Clinical data
- Trade names: Levarterenol, Levophed, Norepin, other
- Other names: Noradrenaline (R)-(–)-Norepinephrine l-1-(3,4-Dihydroxyphenyl)-2-aminoethanol; 3,4,β-Trihydroxyphenethylamine
- AHFS/Drugs.com: Monograph
- License data: US DailyMed: Norepinephrine; US FDA: Norepinephrine
- Pregnancy category: AU: B3
- Routes of administration: Intravenous
- Drug class: Adrenergic receptor agonist; Sympathomimetic
- ATC code: C01CA03 (WHO)

Physiological data
- Source tissues: Locus coeruleus; sympathetic nervous system; adrenal medulla
- Target tissues: System-wide
- Receptors: α_{1}, α_{2}, β_{1}, β_{3}
- Agonists: Sympathomimetic drugs, clonidine, isoprenaline
- Antagonists: Tricyclic antidepressants, Beta blockers, antipsychotics
- Metabolism: MAO-A; COMT

Legal status
- Legal status: AU: S4 (Prescription only); CA: ℞-only; UK: POM (Prescription only); US: ℞-only; EU: Rx-only

Pharmacokinetic data
- Metabolism: MAO-A; COMT
- Excretion: Urine (84–96%)

Identifiers
- IUPAC name: 4-[(1R)-2-amino-1-hydroxyethyl]benzene-1,2-diol
- CAS Number: 51-41-2
- PubChem CID: 439260
- IUPHAR/BPS: 505
- DrugBank: DB00368
- ChemSpider: 388394
- UNII: X4W3ENH1CV
- KEGG: D00076; as salt: D05206
- ChEBI: CHEBI:18357
- ChEMBL: ChEMBL1437

Chemical and physical data
- Formula: C_{8}H_{11}NO_{3}
- Molar mass: 169.180 g·mol^{−1}
- 3D model (JSmol): Interactive image
- Density: 1.397±0.06 g/cm^{3}
- Melting point: 217 °C (423 °F) (decomposes)
- Boiling point: 442.6 °C (828.7 °F) ±40.0°C
- SMILES: Oc1ccc(cc1O)[C@@H](O)CN
- InChI: InChI=1S/C8H11NO3/c9-4-8(12)5-1-2-6(10)7(11)3-5/h1-3,8,10-12H,4,9H2/t8-/m0/s1; Key:SFLSHLFXELFNJZ-QMMMGPOBSA-N

Norepinephrine, also known as noradrenaline and sold under the brand name Levophed among others, is a medication used to treat people with very low blood pressure. It is the typical medication used in sepsis if low blood pressure does not improve following intravenous fluids. It is the same molecule as the hormone and neurotransmitter norepinephrine. It is given by slow injection into a vein.

Common side effects include headache, slow heart rate, and anxiety. Other side effects include an irregular heartbeat. If it leaks out of the vein at the site it is being given, norepinephrine can result in limb ischemia. If leakage occurs the use of phentolamine in the area affected may improve outcomes. Norepinephrine works by binding and activating alpha adrenergic receptors.

Norepinephrine was discovered in 1946 and was approved for medical use in the United States in 1950. It is available as a generic medication.

== Medical uses ==
Norepinephrine is used mainly as a sympathomimetic drug to treat people in vasodilatory shock states such as septic shock and neurogenic shock, while showing fewer adverse side-effects compared to dopamine treatment.

== Pharmacology ==
=== Mechanism of action ===
It stimulates α_{1} and α_{2} adrenergic receptors to cause blood vessel contraction, thus increases peripheral vascular resistance and resulted in increased blood pressure. This effect also reduces the blood supply to gastrointestinal tract and kidneys. Norepinephrine acts on beta-1 adrenergic receptors, causing increase in heart rate and cardiac output. However, the elevation in heart rate is only transient, as baroreceptor response to the rise in blood pressure as well as enhanced vagal tone ultimately result in a sustained decrease in heart rate. Norepinephrine acts more on alpha receptors than the beta receptors.

=== Pharmacokinetics ===
Norepinephrine does not cross the blood–brain barrier under normal circumstances and hence is a peripherally selective drug.

== Chemistry ==
Norepinephrine, or noradrenaline, also known as 3,4,β-trihydroxyphenethylamine, is a substituted phenethylamine and catecholamine. It is the N-demethylated analogue of epinephrine (adrenaline; 3,4,β-trihydroxy-N-methylphenethylamine) and the β-hydroxylated analogue of dopamine (3,4-dihydroxyphenethylamine).

== Society and culture ==
=== Names ===
Norepinephrine is the generic name of the drug and its INN, while noradrenaline is its BAN. It is often referred to as simply "levo" in clinical settings in the United States, an abbreviation of the trade name Levophed.
