= Epinephrine (medication) =

Hormone used as a medicine

- Skeletal formula of adrenaline

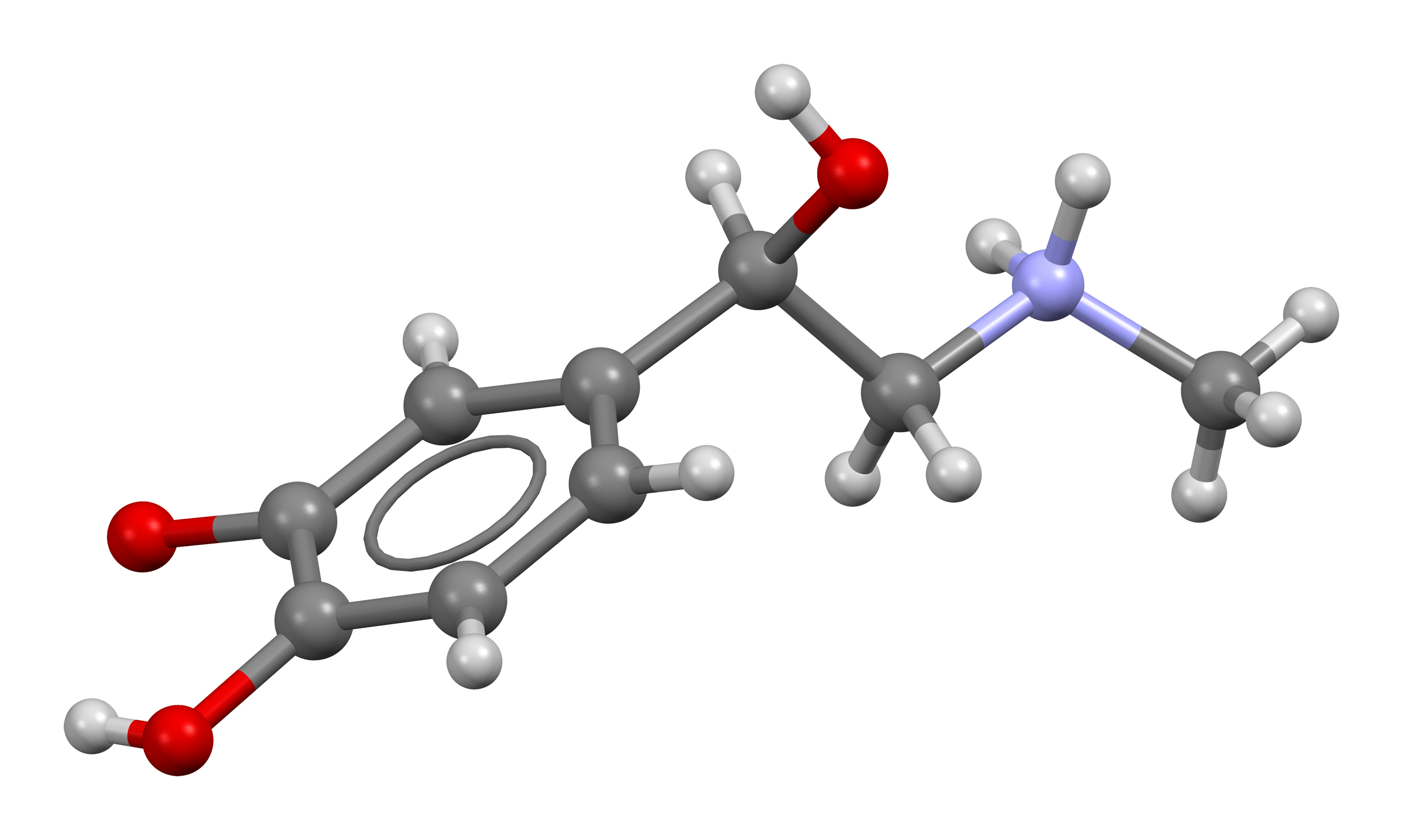
- Ball-and-stick model of the zwitterionic form of adrenaline found in the crystal structure

Clinical data
- Trade names: Epipen, Adrenaclick, others
- Other names: Epinephrine, adrenaline, adrenalin; 3,4,β-Trihydroxy-N-methylphenethylamine
- AHFS/Drugs.com: Monograph
- MedlinePlus: a603002
- License data: US DailyMed: Epinephrine
- Pregnancy category: AU: A
- Routes of administration: Intravenous, intramuscular, endotracheal, intracardiac, intranasal, ophthalmic
- Drug class: Adrenergic receptor agonist; Sympathomimetic
- ATC code: A01AD01 (WHO) B02BC09 (WHO) C01CA24 (WHO) R01AA14 (WHO) R03AA01 (WHO) S01EA01 (WHO)

Physiological data
- Receptors: Adrenergic receptors
- Metabolism: Adrenergic synapse (MAO and COMT)

Legal status
- Legal status: AU: S4 (Prescription only); UK: POM (Prescription only); US: ℞-only; EU: Rx-only

Pharmacokinetic data
- Bioavailability: Oral: negligible; Intravenous: c. 99%; Subcutaneous: high
- Protein binding: 15–20%
- Metabolism: Adrenergic synapse (MAO and COMT)
- Metabolites: Metanephrine
- Onset of action: Rapid
- Elimination half-life: 2–3 minutes in plasma
- Duration of action: Few minutes
- Excretion: Urine

Identifiers
- IUPAC name: (R)-4-(1-Hydroxy-2-(methylamino)ethyl)benzene-1,2-diol
- CAS Number: 51-43-4
- PubChem CID: 5816
- IUPHAR/BPS: 479
- DrugBank: DB00668
- ChemSpider: 5611
- UNII: YKH834O4BH
- KEGG: D00095
- ChEBI: CHEBI:28918
- ChEMBL: ChEMBL679
- PDB ligand: ALE (PDBe, RCSB PDB)

Chemical and physical data
- Formula: C_{9}H_{13}NO_{3}
- Molar mass: 183.207 g·mol^{−1}
- 3D model (JSmol): Interactive image
- Density: 1.283±0.06 g/cm^{3} @ 20 °C, 760 Torr
- SMILES: CNC[C@H](O)c1ccc(O)c(O)c1
- InChI: InChI=1S/C9H13NO3/c1-10-5-9(13)6-2-3-7(11)8(12)4-6/h2-4,9-13H,5H2,1H3/t9-/m0/s1; Key:UCTWMZQNUQWSLP-VIFPVBQESA-N

Epinephrine, also known as adrenaline, is a medication and hormone. As a medication, it is used to treat several conditions, including anaphylaxis, cardiac arrest, asthma, and superficial bleeding. Inhaled epinephrine may be used to improve the symptoms of croup. It may also be used for asthma when other treatments are not effective. It is given intravenously, by injection into a muscle, by inhalation, or by injection just under the skin.

Common side effects include shakiness, anxiety, and sweating. A fast heart rate and high blood pressure may occur. Occasionally, it may result in an abnormal heart rhythm. While the safety of its use during pregnancy and breastfeeding is unclear, the benefits to the mother must be taken into account.

Epinephrine is normally produced by both the adrenal glands and a small number of neurons in the brain, where it acts as a neurotransmitter. It plays an essential role in the fight-or-flight response by increasing blood flow to muscles, heart output, pupil dilation, and blood sugar. Epinephrine does this through its effects on alpha and beta receptors. It is found in many animals and some single-celled organisms, but the medication is produced synthetically and is not harvested from animals.

Jōkichi Takamine first isolated epinephrine in 1901, and it came into medical use in 1905. It is on the World Health Organization's List of Essential Medicines. It is available as a generic medication. In 2023, it was the 247th most commonly prescribed medication in the United States, with more than 1 million prescriptions.

== Etymology ==
The word epinephrine is formed from the Ancient Greek ἐπι- (epi-, "on") and νεφρός (nephros, "kidney") because the adrenal glands, where it is produced, are located just above the kidneys.

== Medical uses ==
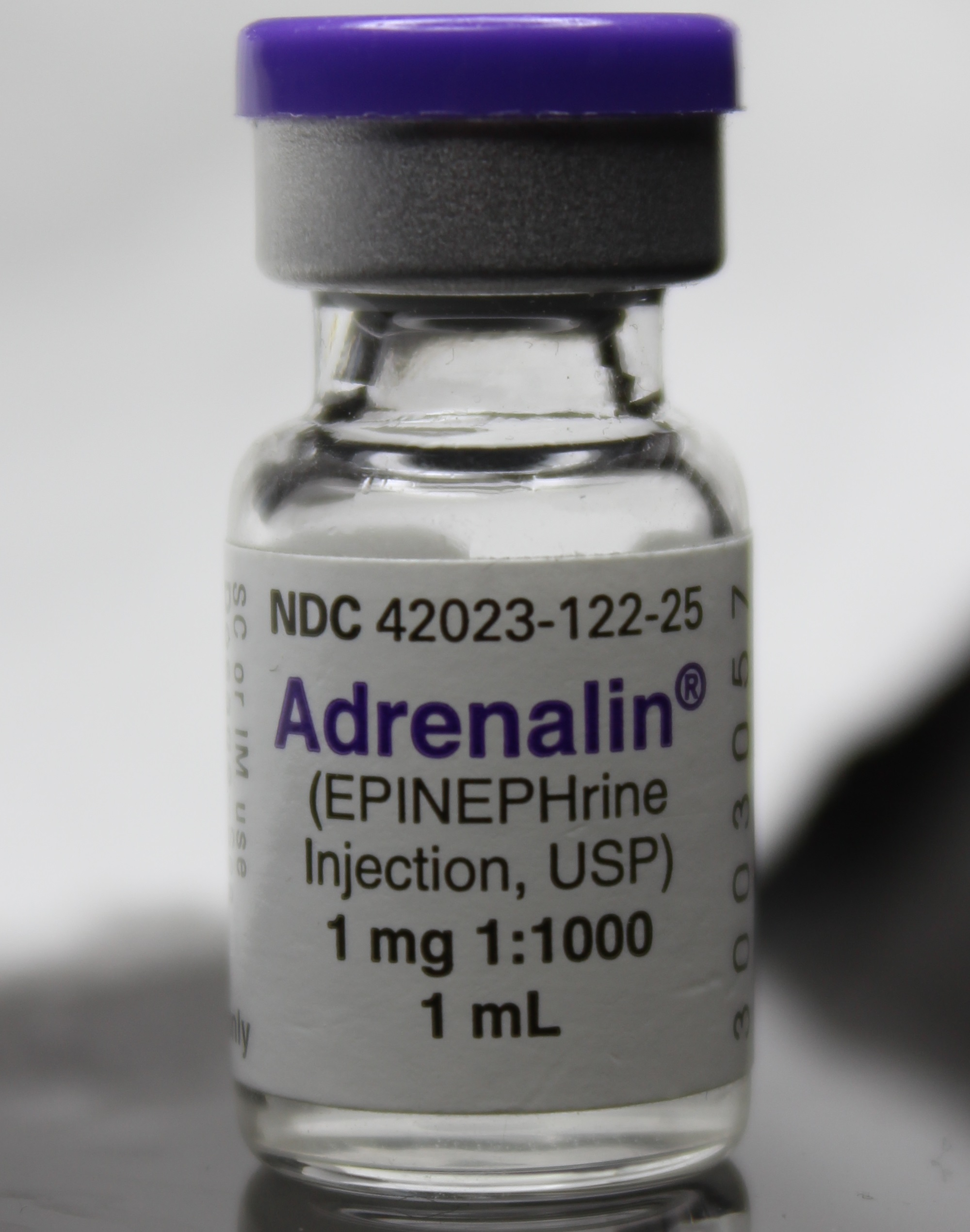
Epinephrine vial 1 mg (Adrenalin)

Epinephrine is used to treat a number of conditions, including cardiac arrest, anaphylaxis, and superficial bleeding. It has been used historically for bronchospasm and low blood sugar, but newer treatments for these that are selective for β_{2} adrenoceptors, such as salbutamol, are preferred.

=== Heart problems ===
While epinephrine is often used to treat cardiac arrest, it has not been shown to improve long-term survival or mental function after recovery. It does, however, improve return of spontaneous circulation.

=== Anaphylaxis ===
Epinephrine is the only life-saving treatment for anaphylaxis. The commonly used epinephrine autoinjector delivers a 0.3 mg epinephrine injection (0.3 mL, 1:1000). It is indicated in the emergency treatment of allergic reactions, including anaphylaxis to stings, contrast agents, medicines, or people with a history of anaphylactic reactions to known triggers. A lower-strength product is available for children.

Intramuscular injection can be complicated in that the depth of subcutaneous fat varies and may result in subcutaneous injection, or may be injected intravenously in error, or the wrong strength used. Intramuscular injection gives a faster and higher pharmacokinetic profile compared to subcutaneous injection.

In August 2024, an epinephrine nasal spray (brand name Neffy) was approved in the United States for the emergency treatment of allergic reactions (type I), including those that are life-threatening (anaphylaxis), in people who weigh at least 30 kilograms (66 lb). It is the first nasal spray for the treatment of anaphylaxis approved by the US Food and Drug Administration (FDA). In March 2025, the FDA expanded the indication of Neffy to include children aged four years of age and older who weigh 15 to 30 kilograms (33 to 66 lb).

The approval of epinephrine nasal spray is based on four studies in 175 healthy adults, without anaphylaxis, that measured the epinephrine concentrations in the blood following administration of epinephrine nasal spray or approved epinephrine injection products. Results from these studies showed comparable epinephrine blood concentrations between epinephrine nasal spray and approved epinephrine injection products. Epinephrine nasal spray also demonstrated similar increases in blood pressure and heart rate as epinephrine injection products, two critical effects of epinephrine in the treatment of anaphylaxis. A study of epinephrine nasal spray in children weighing more than 66 pounds showed that epinephrine concentrations in children were similar to adults who received epinephrine nasal spray.

The most common side effects of epinephrine nasal spray include throat irritation, tingling nose (intranasal paresthesia), headache, nasal discomfort, feeling jittery, tingling sensation (paresthesia), fatigue, tremor, runny nose (rhinorrhea), itchiness inside the nose (nasal pruritus), sneezing, abdominal pain, gum (gingival) pain, numbness in the mouth (hypoesthesia oral), nasal congestion, dizziness, nausea and vomiting. The FDA granted the application of epinephrine nasal spray fast track designation and granted the approval of Neffy to ARS Pharmaceuticals.

=== Asthma ===
Epinephrine is also used as a bronchodilator for asthma if specific β_{2} agonists are unavailable or ineffective.

Because of the high intrinsic efficacy (receptor binding ability) of epinephrine, high drug concentrations cause adverse side effects when treating asthma. The value of using nebulized epinephrine in acute asthma is unclear.

=== Croup ===
Racemic epinephrine has been used for the treatment of croup. Racemic adrenaline is a 1:1 mixture of the two enantiomers of adrenaline. The L-form is the active component. Racemic adrenaline works by stimulating the alpha-adrenergic receptors in the airway, with resultant mucosal vasoconstriction and decreased subglottic edema, and by stimulating the β adrenergic receptors, with resultant relaxation of the bronchial smooth muscle.

=== Bronchiolitis ===
There is a lack of consensus as to whether inhaled nebulized epinephrine is beneficial in the treatment of bronchiolitis, with most guidelines recommending against its use.

=== Local anesthetics ===
When epinephrine is mixed with local anesthetics, such as bupivacaine or lidocaine, and used for local anesthesia or intrathecal injection, it prolongs the numbing effect and motor block effect of the anesthetic by up to an hour. Epinephrine is frequently combined with local anesthetic and can cause panic attacks.

Epinephrine is mixed with cocaine to form Moffett's solution, used in nasal surgery.

=== Upper airway obstruction ===
Upper airway obstruction with edema and stridor can be treated with racemic epinephrine.

== Adverse effects ==
Adverse reactions to adrenaline include palpitations, tachycardia, arrhythmia, anxiety, panic attack, headache, anorexia, tremor, hypertension, and acute pulmonary edema. The use of epinephrine based eye-drops, commonly used to treat glaucoma, may also lead to a buildup of adrenochrome pigments in the conjunctiva, iris, lens, and retina.

Rarely, exposure to medically administered epinephrine may cause Takotsubo cardiomyopathy.

Use is contraindicated in people on nonselective β-blockers because severe hypertension and even cerebral hemorrhage may result.

The most common side effects of epinephrine nasal spray include throat irritation, tingling nose (intranasal paresthesia), headache, nasal discomfort, feeling jittery, tingling sensation (paresthesia), fatigue, tremor, runny nose (rhinorrhea), itchiness inside the nose (nasal pruritus), sneezing, abdominal pain, gum (gingival) pain, numbness in the mouth (hypoesthesia oral), nasal congestion, dizziness, nausea and vomiting. The FDA granted the application of epinephrine nasal spray fast track designation and granted the approval of Neffy to ARS Pharmaceuticals.

== Mechanism of action ==
Physiologic responses by organ
Organ	Effects
Heart	Increases heart rate; contractility; conduction across AV node
Lungs	Increases respiratory rate; bronchodilation
Liver	Stimulates glycogenolysis
Brain	
Systemic	Vasoconstriction and vasodilation
Systemic	Triggers lipolysis
Systemic	Muscle contraction

Epinephrine acts by binding to a variety of adrenergic receptors. Epinephrine is a nonselective agonist of all adrenergic receptors, including the major subtypes α_{1}, α_{2}, β_{1}, β_{2}, and β_{3}. Epinephrine's binding to these receptors triggers several metabolic changes. Binding to α-adrenergic receptors inhibits insulin secretion by the pancreas, stimulates glycogenolysis in the liver and muscle, and stimulates glycolysis and inhibits insulin-mediated glycogenesis in muscle. β adrenergic receptor binding triggers glucagon secretion in the pancreas, increased adrenocorticotropic hormone (ACTH) secretion by the pituitary gland, and increased lipolysis by adipose tissue. Together, these effects increase blood glucose and fatty acids, providing substrates for energy production within cells throughout the body. In the heart, the coronary arteries have a predominance of β_{2} receptors, which cause vasodilation of the coronary arteries in the presence of epinephrine.

Its actions increase peripheral resistance via α_{1} receptor-dependent vasoconstriction and increase cardiac output via its binding to β_{1} receptors. The goal of reducing peripheral circulation is to increase coronary and cerebral perfusion pressures and therefore increase oxygen exchange at the cellular level. While epinephrine does increase aortic, cerebral, and carotid circulation pressure, it lowers carotid blood flow and end-tidal CO_{2} or E_{T}CO_{2} levels. It appears that epinephrine may improve macrocirculation at the expense of the capillary beds where perfusion takes place.

== Chemistry ==
Epinephrine, or adrenaline, also known as 3,4,β-trihydroxy-N-methylphenethylamine, is a substituted phenethylamine and catecholamine. It is the N-methylated analogue of norepinephrine (noradrenaline; 3,4,β-trihydroxyphenethylamine) and the N-methylated and β-hydroxylated analogue of dopamine (3,4-dihydroxyphenethylamine).

== History ==
Extracts of the adrenal gland were first obtained by Polish physiologist Napoleon Cybulski in 1895. These extracts, which he called nadnerczyna, contained adrenaline and other catecholamines. American ophthalmologist William H. Bates discovered adrenaline's usage for eye surgeries prior to 20 April 1896. Japanese chemist Jōkichi Takamine and his assistant Keizo Uenaka independently discovered adrenaline in 1900. In 1901, Takamine successfully isolated and purified the hormone from the adrenal glands of sheep and oxen. Adrenaline was first synthesized in the laboratory by Friedrich Stolz and Henry Drysdale Dakin, independently, in 1904.

== Society and culture ==
=== Brand names ===
Epinephrine is the generic name of the drug and its INN and USAN, while adrenaline is its BAN. Epinephrine is sold under various brand names including Asthmanefrin, Micronefrin, Neffy, Nephron, VapoNefrin, and Primatene Mist, among others.

=== Legal status ===
In June 2024, the Committee for Medicinal Products for Human Use of the European Medicines Agency adopted a positive opinion, recommending the granting of a marketing authorization for the medicinal product Eurneffy, intended for emergency treatment of allergic reactions (anaphylaxis) due to insect stings or bites, foods, medicinal products, and other allergens as well as idiopathic or exercise-induced anaphylaxis. The applicant for this medicinal product is ARS Pharmaceuticals IRL Limited. Eurneffy was authorized for medical use in the European Union in August 2024.

=== Delivery forms ===
Epinephrine is available in an autoinjector delivery system and a nasal spray.

There is an epinephrine metered-dose inhaler sold over the counter in the United States to relieve bronchial asthma. It was introduced in 1963 by Armstrong Pharmaceuticals.

A common concentration for epinephrine is 2.25% w/v epinephrine in solution, which contains 22.5 mg/mL, while a 1% solution is typically used for aerosolization.
