= Pathobiology of Early Arthritis Cohort =

The Pathobiology of Early Arthritis Cohort (PEAC) is a consortium of independent, national centres of excellence with the specific purpose to create an extensively phenotyped cohort of patients with early inflammatory arthritis with linked, detailed pathobiological data.

== Participating Centres ==
- Queen Mary, University of London
- University of Glasgow
- University of Birmingham
- Imperial College London
- King's College London
- University of Manitoba
- University College Dublin
- Hemel Hempstead General Hospital
- Università degli Studi di Pavia
- The University of Manchester
- Ospedale Niguarda Ca' Granda
- University of Oxford
