= Medicon Valley Alliance =

Organization

- Abbreviation: MVA
- Formation: 1997
- Type: Not-for-profit
- Purpose: Realizing the potential of Medicon Valley by facilitating networking and knowledge-sharing, collaboration, analysing challenges and potentials and mobilizing support from key opinion leaders.
- Headquarters: Ørestaden, Copenhagen
- Location: Arne Jacobsens Allé 15, 2.
- Region served: Medicon Valley
- Members: 300
- Official language: English, Danish, Swedish
- CEO: Anette Steenberg
- Website: Medicon Valley Alliance

Medicon Valley Alliance (or MVA for short) is the Danish-Swedish cluster organisation representing human life sciences in the cross-border region of Medicon Valley. As a non-profit member organisation, Medicon Valley Alliance (MVA) carries out initiatives on behalf of the local life science community in order to create new research and business opportunities – initiatives which members would not be able to implement individually, and with the aim of strengthening the development of Medicon Valley.

== The organisation ==
MVA's member base comprises biotech, medtech and pharma companies of all sizes, contract research organizations and contract manufacturing organizations , as well as public organizations, universities, science parks, investors, and various business service providers.

MVA is committed to facilitate economic growth, increased competitiveness and employment in Medicon Valley, and is furthermore committed to raise the international recognition of Medicon Valley with the aim of attracting labour, investments, and partners. MVA accomplish this by enhancing local networks, improving local framework conditions, increasing the visibility of Medicon Valley and facilitating international relations to companies and research institutions around the world.

There are currently +300 MVA-members including numerous big and small private biotech companies and public sector research institutions. Among the most prominent members are Novo Nordisk, Technical University of Denmark, University of Lund and University of Copenhagen

The current CEO of Medicon Valley Alliance is Anette Stenberg, following Petter Hartman and Stig Jørgensen.

Chairman of the board is CEO of Alligator Bioscience, Søren Bregenholt. Deputy chairman is Ulf G. Andersson, CEO of MEDEON.

== Membership ==
MVA participants comprise academic departments, regions (hospital managers), states, research, pharmaceutical and medical firms, CROs, CMOs, technology parks, developers, market service providers and other Medicon Valley organizations.
