= Anthracycline =

Class of antibiotics

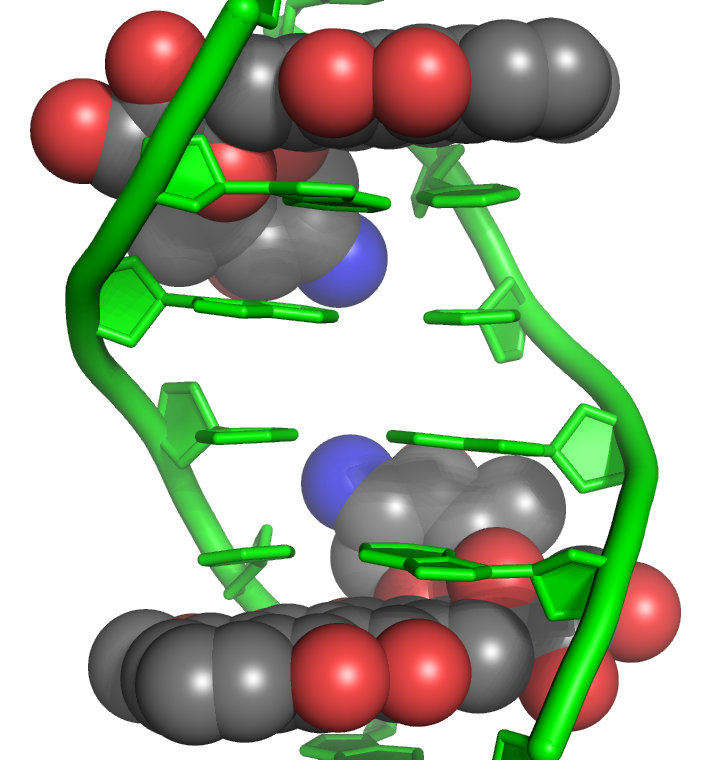
Doxorubicin as an intercalating agent. Two doxorubicin molecules intercalated within DNA.

Anthracyclines are a class of drugs used in cancer chemotherapy that are extracted from Streptomyces peucetius bacterium. These compounds are used to treat many cancers, including leukemias, lymphomas, breast, stomach, uterine, ovarian, bladder cancer, and lung cancers. The first anthracycline discovered was daunorubicin (trade name Daunomycin), which is produced naturally by Streptomyces peucetius, a species of Actinomycetota. Clinically the most important anthracyclines are doxorubicin, daunorubicin, epirubicin and idarubicin.

The anthracyclines are among the most effective anticancer treatments ever developed and are effective against more types of cancer than any other class of chemotherapeutic agents. Their main adverse effect is cardiotoxicity, which considerably limits their usefulness. Use of anthracyclines has also been shown to be significantly associated with cycle 1 severe or febrile neutropenia. Other adverse effects include vomiting.

The drugs act mainly by intercalating with DNA and interfering with DNA metabolism and RNA production. Cytotoxicity is primarily due to inhibition of topoisomerase II after the enzyme induces a break in DNA, preventing religation of the break and leading to cell death. The basic structure of anthracyclines is that of a tetracyclic molecule with an anthraquinone backbone connected to a sugar moiety by a glycosidic linkage. When taken up by a cell the four ring structure intercalates between DNA bases pairs while the sugar sits within the minor groove and interacts with adjacent base pairs.

== History ==
Daunorubicin, the prototypical anthracycline. Used against: Acute myeloid leukemia (AML), acute lymphocytic leukemia (ALL), chronic myelogenous leukemia (CML), and Kaposi's sarcoma

Doxorubicin. Used against: Breast, lung, ovarian, liver and thyroid carcinomas, leukemias and lymphomas

Epirubicin. Used against: Breast, ovarian, gastric, lung cancers, and lymphomas

Idarubicin. Used against: Acute myeloid leukemia (AML)

Daunorubicin is a red pigmented drug which was discovered in the early 1960s. It was isolated from a strain of Streptomyces peucetius by A. Di Marco and coworkers, working for Farmitalia Research Laboratories in Italy who called it daunomycin. About the same time Dubost and coworkers in France also discovered the compound and named it rubidomycin. Daunorubicin was adopted as the international name. Initially it was seen to have activity against murine tumours and then in clinical trials it was found to be active against leukaemia and lymphomas.

Doxorubicin was isolated from a mutated variant of S. peucetius (var. caesius). It differs from daunorubicin only by the addition of a hydroxyl group at the carbon 14 position. This modification greatly changes the activity of the drug making it highly effective against a wide range of solid tumours, leukaemia and lymphomas. It is the standard by which novel anthracyclines are judged.

The first anthracyclines were so successful that thousands of analogues have been produced in attempts to find compounds with improved therapeutic applications. Only epirubicin and idarubicin have been adopted for worldwide use. Epirubicin has similar activity to doxorubicin, however has reduced cardiotoxic side effects. Idarubicin is a fat soluble variant of daunorubicin and is orally bioavailable.

Several groups of researchers focused on designing compounds that retained the polycyclic aromatic chromophore of the anthracyclines (favouring intercalation into DNA) and substituting the sugar residue with simple side chains. This led to the identification of the mitoxantrone which is classed as an anthracenedione compound and is used in the clinic for the management of various cancers. Disaccharide analogues have been shown to retain anticancer activity, and are being further investigated with respect to their mechanism of action.

Although it has been 50 years from the discovery of anthracyclines, and despite recent advances in the development of targeted therapies for cancers, around 32% of breast cancer patients, 57%-70% of elderly lymphoma patients and 50–60% of childhood cancer patients are treated with anthracyclines. Some cancers benefit from neoadjuvant anthracycline-based regimes, and these include triple negative breast cancers that do not respond well to targeted therapies due to the lack of available receptors that can be targeted. Compared to non-triple negative breast cancer patients, triple negative breast cancer patients have shown better response rate and higher pathological response rate with anthracycline use, an indicator used for predicting improved long-term outcomes.

=== Clinical trials ===
Anthracyclines remain some of the most widely used chemotherapeutic agents but their potential is limited by its dose-limiting toxicities. Currently, there are many studies being conducted in the search for anthracyclines with better anti-tumour efficacy or with reduced side effects using different nanotechnology-based drug delivery systems.

== Mechanism of action ==
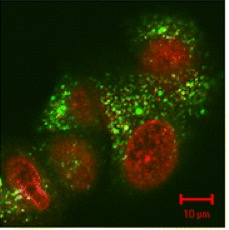
Doxorubicin localisation to nuclei. Localisation of doxorubicin (red) in the nuclei of MCF-7_{cc10} cells. Green fluorescence represents lysosome.

The anthracyclines have been widely studied for their interactions with cellular components and impact on cellular processes. This includes studies in cultured cells and in whole animal systems. A myriad of drug-cellular interactions have been documented in the scientific literature and these vary with respect to the properties of target cells, drug dose and drug intermediates produced. Since artefactual mechanisms of action can be observed, the following mechanisms which occur at clinically relevant drug concentrations are the most important.

=== DNA Intercalation ===
Anthracyclines are readily taken up by cells and localised to the nucleus. The chromophore moiety of anthracyclines has intercalating function and inserts in between the adjacent base pair of DNA. The intercalating function inhibits DNA and RNA synthesis in highly replicating cells, subsequently blocking the transcription and replication processes.

=== Topoisomerase II poison ===
This is by far the most-accepted mechanism to explain the action of anthracyclines as topoisomerase-II mediated toxicity is evident at clinically relevant drug concentrations. Topoisomerase-II is an enzyme that creates temporary double-stranded DNA (dsDNA) breaks and reseals them after managing torsion of DNA supercoils. Anthracyclines intercalated into DNA, form a stable anthracycline-DNA-topoisomerase II ternary complex thus "poisoning" the enzyme and impeding the religation of double-stranded DNA breaks. This topoisomerase-II-mediated DNA damage subsequently promotes growth arrest and recruits DNA repair machinery. When the repair process fails, the lesions initiate programmed cell death.

=== Reactive oxygen species ===
The quinone moiety of anthracyclines can undergo redox reactions to generate excessive reactive oxygen species (ROS) in the presence of oxidoreductive enzymes such as cytochrome P450 reductase, NADH dehydrogenase and xanthine oxidase. Converting quinone to semiquinone produces free radicals that actively react with oxygen to generate superoxides, hydroxyl radicals and peroxides. In addition, the availability of cellular iron catalyses redox reactions and further generates ROS. The excessive ROS that cannot be detoxified results in oxidative stress, DNA damage, and lipid peroxidation thereby triggering apoptosis.

=== DNA adduct formation ===
Anthracyclines can also form adducts with DNA by a single covalent bond through an aminal linkage from the 3'-amino of daunosamine to the exocyclic amino of guanine. The supply of extracellular formaldehyde using formaldehyde-releasing prodrugs can promote covalent DNA adduct formation. Such adducts have been shown to block GpC specific transcription factors and induce apoptotic responses.

=== Clinical implications ===
Results from a recent meta-analysis provide evidence that breast cancer patients with either duplication of centromere 17 or aberrations in TOP2A, the gene coding for topoisomerase-IIα, benefit from adjuvant chemotherapy that incorporates anthracyclines. This does not include subgroups of patients that harbour amplification of HER2. The observations from this study also allow patients to be identified where anthracyclines might be safely omitted from treatment strategies.

== Side effects ==
Anthracycline administration is often accompanied by adverse drug reactions that limit the use of anthracyclines in the clinics. Two major dose limiting toxicities of anthracyclines include myelosuppression and cardiotoxicity. Fortunately, the introduction of therapeutic cytokines allows management of myelosuppression. Hence, cardiac injury remains as the major drawback of anthracycline-based anti-cancer agents. Cardiotoxicity in patients and mice can be mitigated by circulating hemopexin.

Anthracycline-mediated cardiotoxicity is dose-dependent and cumulative, with the damage imposed to heart occurring upon the very first dose and then accumulating with each anthracycline cycle. There are four types of anthracycline-associated cardiotoxicity that have been described.

Anthracycline-mediated cardiotoxicity progression and symptoms
Types of cardiotoxicity	Time to presentation	Symptoms
Acute	During and immediately after drug administration	Vasodilation, hypotension, transient cardiac rhythm disturbances
Subchronic	1–3 days post-drug administration	Pericarditis-myocarditis
Early chronic	Less than 1 year after completing anthracycline treatment	Dilated cardiomyopathy, restrictive cardiomyopathy (uncommon), left ventricular contractile dysfunction, congestive heart failure
Delayed/late onset chronic	More than 1 year after completing anthracycline treatment	Restrictive cardiomyopathy, dilated cardiomyopathy, congestive heart failure

In the clinic, a maximum recommended cumulative dose is set for anthracyclines to prevent the development of congestive heart failure. As an example, the incidence of congestive heart failure is 4.7%, 26% and 48% respectively when patients received doxorubicin at 400 mg/m^{2}, 550 mg/m^{2} and 700 mg/m^{2}. Therefore, the lifetime cumulative doxorubicin exposure is limited to 400–450 mg/m^{2} in order to reduce congestive heart failure incidence to less than 5%, although variation in terms of tolerance to doxorubicin exists between individuals. The risk factors that influence the extent of cardiac injury caused by anthracyclines include genetic variability, age (low or high age groups), previous treatments with cardiotoxic drugs and history of cardiac diseases. Children are particularly at risk due to the anthracycline activity that can compromise the development of the immature heart.

Cardiac injury that occurs in response to initial doses of anthracycline can be detected by a rise in troponin level immediately after administration. Biopsy also allows early detection of cardiac injury by evaluating heart ultrastructure changes. Receiving cumulative doses of anthracycline causes left ventricle dysfunction and with continued dosage reaches a certain threshold that can be clinically detected by non-invasive techniques such as 2D echocardiography and strain rate imaging. Advances in developing more sensitive imaging techniques and biomarkers allow early detection of cardiotoxicity and allow cardioprotective intervention to prevent anthracycline-mediated cardiotoxicity.

The predominant susceptibility of the heart to anthracyclines is due in part to a preferential mitochondrial localisation of anthracyclines. This is attributed to high affinity interaction between anthracyclines and cardiolipin, a phospholipid present in the heart mitochondrial membrane, as heart tissue contains a relatively high number of mitochondria per cell. Heart tissue also has an impaired defence against oxidative stress, displaying a low level of anti-oxidant enzymes such as catalase and superoxide dismutase for detoxifying anthracycline-mediated ROS.

The mechanisms accounting for anthracycline-induced cardiac damage are complex and interrelated. It was first recognised to be related to the oxidative stress induced by anthracyclines. A more recent explanation has emerged, in which anthracycline-mediated cardiotoxicity is due to anthracycline-topoisomerase IIb poisoning, leading to downstream oxidative stress.

In order to reduce the impact of cardiac injury in response to anthracyclines, a few cardioprotective strategies have been explored. Liposomal formulations of anthracyclines (discussed below) have been developed and used to reduce cardiac damage. Other novel anthracycline analogues such as epirubicin and idarubicin also provide options to reduce adverse cardiac events; these analogues have failed to show superior anti-cancer activity to the parent compounds. An alternative drug administration method involving continuous infusion for 72 h as compared to bolus administration provides some protection and can be used when high cumulative doses are anticipated.

When anthracyclines are given intravenously, it may result in accidental extravasation at injection sites. It is estimated that the extravasation incidence ranges from 0.1% to 6%. Extravasation causes serious complications to surrounding tissues with the symptoms of tissue necrosis and skin ulceration. Dexrazoxane is primarily used to treat anthracyclines post-extravasation by acting as a topoisomerase II inhibitor as well as a chelating agent to reduce oxidative stress caused by anthracyclines. Dexrazoxane has also been used with success as a cardioprotective compound in combination with doxorubicin in metastatic breast cancer patients who have been treated with more than 300 mg/m^{2} doxorubicin, as well as in patients who are anticipated to have a beneficial effect from high cumulative doses of doxorubicin.

There is no high quality evidence to confirm if cardioprotective treatments are effective. Studies of the cardioprotective nature of dexrazoxane, provide evidence that it can prevent heart damage without interfering with the anti-tumour effects of anthracycline treatment. Patients given dexrazoxane with their anthracycline treatment had their risk of heart failure reduced compared to those treated with anthracyclines without dexrazoxane. There was no effect on survival though.

Radiolabelled doxorubicin has been utilised as a breast cancer lesion imaging agent in a pilot study. This radiochemical, ^{99m}Tc-doxorubicin, localised to mammary tumour lesions in female patients, and is a potential radiopharmaceutical for imaging of breast tumours.

In some cases, anthracyclines may be ineffective due to the development of drug resistance. It can either be primary resistance (insensitive response to initial therapy) or acquired resistance (present after demonstrating complete or partial response to treatment). Resistance to anthracyclines involves many factors, but it is often related to overexpression of the transmembrane drug efflux protein P-glycoprotein (P-gp) or multidrug resistance protein 1 (MRP1), which removes anthracyclines from cancer cells. A large research effort has been focused in designing inhibitors against MRP1 to re-sensitise anthracycline resistant cells, but many such drugs have failed during clinical trials.

== Liposomal-based clinical formulations ==
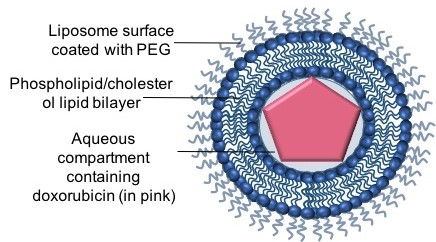
Schematic representation of pegylated liposomal doxorubicin

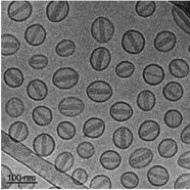
Cryo-TEM images of Doxil (pegylated liposomal doxorubicin)

Liposomes are spherical shape, phospholipid vesicles that can be formed with one or more lipid bilayers with phospholipids or cholesterols. The ability of liposomes to encapsulate both hydrophobic and hydrophilic drug compounds allowed liposomes to be an efficient drug delivery systems (DDS) to deliver a range of drugs in these nano-carriers.

Liposomal formulations of anthracyclines have been developed to maintain or even enhance the therapeutic efficacy of anthracyclines while reduce its limiting toxicities to healthy tissues, particularly cardiotoxicity. Currently, there are two liposomal formulations of doxorubicin available in the clinics.

Doxil/Caelyx is the first FDA approved liposomal DDS, and was initially used to treat AIDS-related Kaposi's sarcoma in 1995 and is now being used for treating recurrent ovarian cancer, metastatic breast cancer with increased cardiac risk, and multiple myeloma. Doxorubicin is encapsulated in a nano-carrier known as Stealth or sterically stabilised liposomes, consisting of unilamellar liposomes coated with hydrophilic polymer polyethylene glycol (PEG) that is covalently linked to liposome phospholipids. The PEG coating serves as a barrier from opsonisation, rapid clearance while the drug is stably retained inside the nano-carriers via an ammonium sulphate chemical gradient. A major advantage of using nano-carriers as a drug delivery system is the ability of the nano-carriers to utilise the leaky vasculature of tumours and their impaired lymphatic drainage via the EPR effect.

The maximum plasma concentration of free doxorubicin after Doxil administration is substantially lower compared to conventional doxorubicin, providing an explanation for its low cardiotoxicity profile. However, Doxil can cause Palmar-plantar erythrodysesthesia (PPE, hand and foot syndrome) due to its accumulation in the skin. Doxil has lower maximum tolerable dose (MTD) at 50 mg/m^{2} every 4 weeks compared to free doxorubicin at 60 mg/m^{2} every 3 weeks. Despite this, the maximum cumulative dose for Doxil is still higher compared to doxorubicin due to its cardioprotective characteristics.

Myocet is another non-pegylated liposome encapsulated doxorubicin citrate complex approved for use in combination with cyclophosphamide in metastatic breast cancer patients as first line treatment in Europe and Canada. Doxorubicin is loaded into the liposomes just before administration to patients with a maximum single dose of 75 mg/m^{2} every 3 weeks. Myocet has similar efficacy as conventional doxorubicin, while significantly reducing cardiac toxicity.

Characteristic comparison between Doxil and Myocet
	Doxil	Myocet	References
Composition of liposomes	PEG-phospholipid Phospholipid Cholesterol	Phospholipid Cholesterol	
Size	80 nm – 100 nm	150 nm - 250 nm	
Drug loading method	Ammonium salt gradient	Citric acid gradient	
Pharmacokinetics	Dose: Single dose at 10 mg/m^{2} - 20 mg/m^{2} Peak plasma concentration: 7.4 μM – 15.3 μM (Note: converted into molarity using doxorubicin molecular weight at 543.52 g/mol) Elimination half life: 50.2 h – 54.5 h (Note: using AIDS-related Kaposi's sarcoma patient as example)	Dose: Single dose at 60 mg/m^{2} Peak plasma concentration: 16 μM Elimination half life: 16.4 h (Note: using metastatic breast cancer patient as example (in combination with cyclophosphamide))	
Clinical indication	AIDS-related Kaposi's sarcoma, recurrent ovarian cancer and metastatic breast cancer	Metastatic breast cancer	

== Adverse drug interactions ==
Drug interactions with anthracyclines can be complex and might be due to the effect, side effects, or metabolism of the anthracycline. Drugs which inhibit Cytochrome P450 or other oxidases may reduce clearance of anthracyclines, prolonging their circulating half-life which can increase cardiotoxicity and other side effects. As they act as antibiotics anthracyclines can reduce the effectiveness of live culture treatments such as Bacillus Calmette-Guerin therapy for bladder cancer. As they act as myelosuppressors anthracyclines can reduce the effectiveness of vaccines by inhibiting the immune system.

Several interactions are of particular clinical importance. Though dexrazoxane can be used to mitigate cardiotoxicity or extravasation damage of anthracyclines it also may reduce their effectiveness and the recommendation is not to start dexrazoxane treatment upon initial anthracycline treatment. Trastuzumab (a HER2 antibody used to treat breast cancer) may enhance the cardiotoxicity of anthracyclines although the interaction can be minimised by implementing a time interval between anthracycline and trastuzumab administration. Taxanes (except docetaxel) may decrease anthracycline metabolism, increasing serum concentrations of anthracyclines. The recommendation is to treat with anthracyclines first if combination treatment with taxanes is required.

== See also ==
- Anthraquinone
- Polymer-drug conjugates
