= Proteus hauseri =

Scientific classification
- Domain: Bacteria
- Kingdom: Pseudomonadati
- Phylum: Pseudomonadota
- Class: Gammaproteobacteria
- Order: Enterobacterales
- Family: Morganellaceae
- Genus: Proteus
- Species: P. hauseri

Binomial name
- Proteus hauseri O'Hara et al., 2000

Species of bacterium

Proteus hauseri is a gram-negative, facultatively anaerobic, rod-shaped bacterium. This species is closely related to Proteus vulgaris.

== Identification ==
Similar to other members of the Enterobacterales order, Proteus hauseri is oxidase negative, catalase positive, glucose fermenting, and nitrate reducing. P. hauseri is ONPG negative and PDA positive. Unlike the more commonly seen species of Proteus, P. hauseri is also able to convert tryptophan into indole, resulting in a positive indole test. P. hauseri shares a similar biochemical profile with Proteus vulgaris but can be differentiated by its ability to produce acid from trehalose. Most strains of P. hauseri demonstrate swarming motility, often covering the entire plate onto which it is inoculated.

== History ==
Strains of Proteus vulgaris were historically divided into three biogroups: Biogroup 1 was characterized as negative for indole, salicin fermentation, and aesculin hydrolysis. Biogroup 2 was characterized as positive for indole, salicin, and aesculin. Biogroup 3 was characterized by positive indole production but negative for salicin and aesculin. Taxonomic studies performed on P. vulgaris biogroup 3 in 1976 suggested that this strain was atypical from the two other P. vulgaris subclusters. DNA hybridization performed on P. vulgaris biogroup 3 isolates found four distinct genomospecies, designate genomospecies 3, 4, 5, and 6. These genomospecies are difficult to differentiate phenotypically; however, P. vulgaris genomospecies 3 is unique in that it is negative for Jordan's tartrate and it was thus designated as Proteus hauseri.

== Pathogenicity ==
P. hauseri is a notable fish pathogen, particularly in koi carp, where mortality can reach as high as 50%.
