= Antineoplastic =

Class of drugs used to treat malignant tumors

Antineoplastic agents
- Drug class
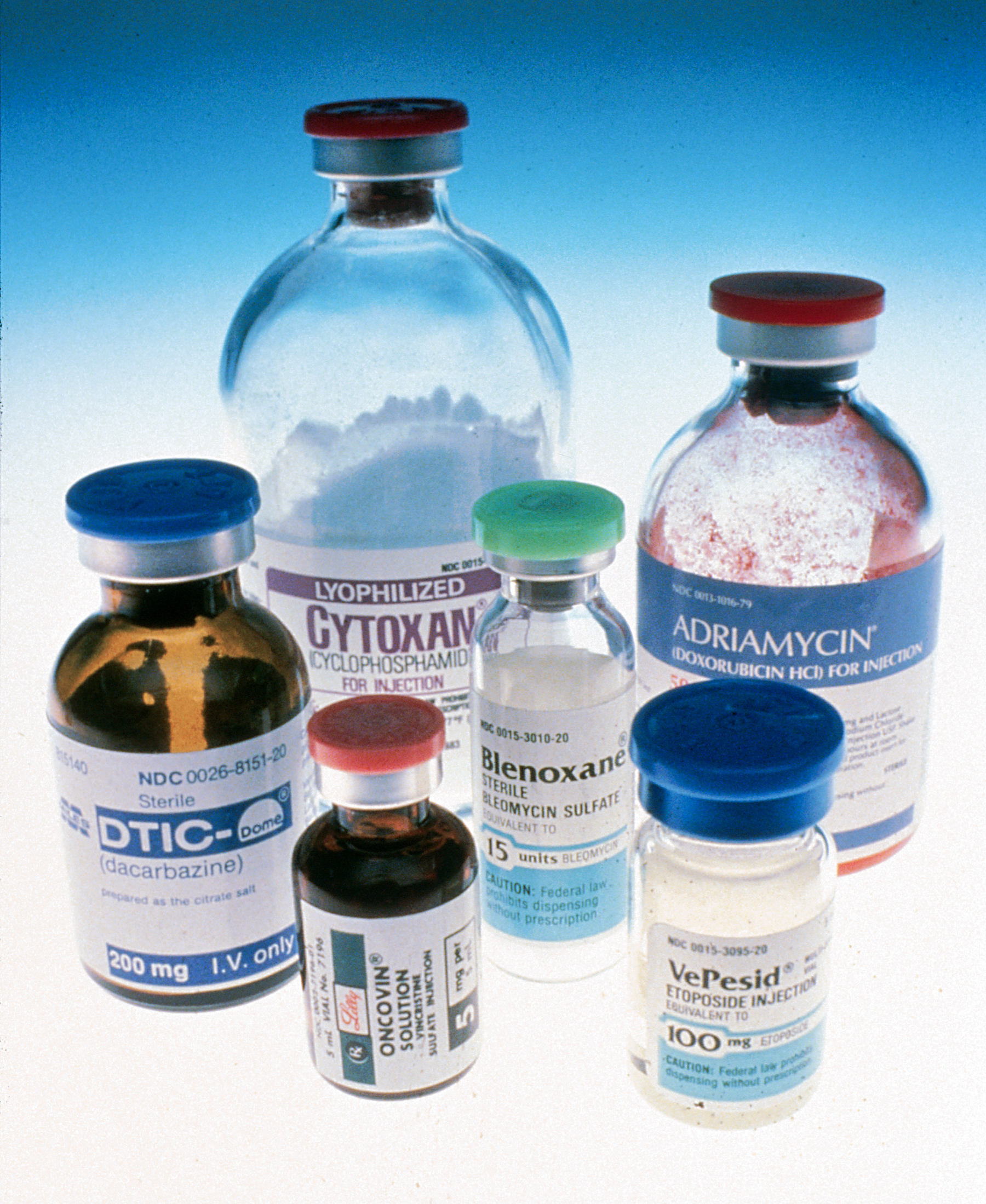
- Clockwise from center: Bleomycin, vincristine, dacarbazine, cyclophosphamide, doxorubicin, etoposide

Class identifiers
- Use: Treatment of malignant tumors
- ATC code: L01
- Biological target: Killing or inhibiting cancer cells

Clinical data
- Drugs.com: Drug Classes

External links
- MeSH: E02.183.750.500

Legal status

Antineoplastic agents, also known as anticancer drugs or antineoplastic drugs, are medications used to treat malignant tumors. These drugs work through various mechanisms to kill or inhibit cancer cells to achieve the goal of treating malignant tumors. Based on their pharmacological actions, antineoplastic drugs can be divided into cytotoxic drugs and non-cytotoxic drugs, with the former primarily consisting of DNA-toxic drugs and the latter mainly comprising molecularly targeted antineoplastic drugs. Commonly used antineoplastic drugs include cisplatin, doxorubicin, paclitaxel, and imatinib.

Traditional cytotoxic drugs, due to their lack of sufficient selectivity for cancer cells, cause varying degrees of damage to normal tissue cells while targeting cancer cells. However, with advancements in tumor molecular biology and translational medicine, antineoplastic drugs have evolved from traditional cytotoxic drugs to non-cytotoxic drugs. Non-cytotoxic drugs are characterized by high selectivity and a high therapeutic index, offering significant clinical advantages.

== Uses ==
Antineoplastic drugs are primarily used in medical settings to treat cancer. Because some antineoplastic drugs also exhibit antiviral activity, they are used to treat certain viral infectious diseases. Certain steroid hormone drugs (used in endocrine therapy), although lacking direct antineoplastic activity, can regulate hormonal balance in the body and suppress certain functional adenocarcinomas, making them commonly used in combination therapies with antineoplastic drugs. Additionally, antineoplastic drugs are employed in scientific research to further understand the molecular biology of cancer through studies of their pharmacological effects.

== History ==
Oxaliplatin, the first platinum-based alkylating agent shown to be effective against colorectal cancer

The first antineoplastic drug, nitrogen mustard, was developed in the 1940s by Louis S. Goodman and Alfred Gilman, Sr. through chemical modification of mustard gas (chemically known as dichlorodiethyl sulfide). Subsequently, chlormethine hydrochloride was approved for clinical use in 1949 as the first antineoplastic drug for treating lymphoma and Hodgkin lymphoma. The first aromatic nitrogen mustard drug, chlorambucil, was approved in 1957 for treating chronic lymphocytic leukemia.

Early antineoplastic drugs were mostly identified through random screening using animal transplantable tumors. Tumor cells exhibit higher phosphoramidase activity than normal cells, and the phosphoryl group, as an electron-withdrawing group, reduces the electron cloud density on the nitrogen atom in nitrogen mustards. Based on this principle, H. Arnold synthesized cyclophosphamide in 1957, which achieved clinical success. In the same year, Charles Heidelberger and colleagues synthesized 5-fluorouracil based on the principle of isoelectronicity, also achieving clinical success. These two drugs were the first effective antineoplastic drugs synthesized based on theoretical principles.

In the early 20th century, Paul Ehrlich proposed the concept of a "magic bullet," envisioning specific compounds that could target drugs to disease sites, reducing damage to normal tissues or cells. This was the initial concept of targeted therapies. In 1948, D. Pressman and G. Keightley suggested using antibodies as cell growth inhibitors and carriers for radionuclides, laying the groundwork for targeted antineoplastic drugs and monoclonal antibody-based therapies. In 1951, W.H. Bellwalt used iodine-131-labeled antibodies to treat thyroid tumors. In 1958, Georges Mathé linked antibodies to methotrexate for treating leukemia. In 1972, T. Ghose and colleagues attached chlorambucil to antibodies to treat melanoma. These experiments validated the feasibility of using antibodies as antineoplastic drugs or carriers, but the antibodies used were polyclonal, with limited specificity and efficacy. In 1975, Georges J. F. Köhler and César Milstein developed monoclonal antibody technology. Due to the high specificity of monoclonal antibodies, targeted antineoplastic drugs began to use them as carriers, leading to the development of numerous monoclonal antibody-based antineoplastic drugs.

Research on the antineoplastic bioactivity of metal platinum complexes began in the 1960s when American physiologist Barnett Rosenberg and colleagues, while studying the effects of electromagnetic fields on microorganism growth, discovered that escherichia coli ceased division and proliferation near platinum electrodes in an ammonium chloride medium. Further studies confirmed that cis-dichlorodiammineplatinum(II) and cis-tetrachlorodiammineplatinum(IV) inhibited cell proliferation. Rosenberg and his collaborators conducted experiments on mice with sarcoma-180 and leukemia L1210, demonstrating cisplatin’s anticancer activity, leading to its entry into clinical trials in 1971. In 1978, the FDA approved cisplatin for treating testicular cancer and ovarian cancer. The second-generation platinum complex drug carboplatin was introduced in the 1980s, and the first chiral platinum complex drug, oxaliplatin, was approved in 1996.

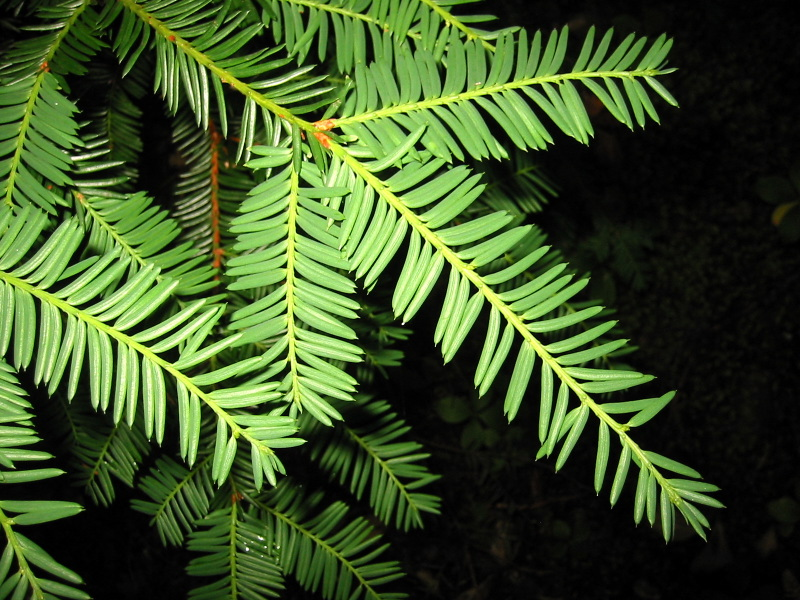
Due to the excessive harm caused by extracting paclitaxel directly from the bark of the Pacific yew, research on paclitaxel was once stalled.

In 1962, Monroe Eliot Wall and Mansukh C. Wani, began studying the antineoplastic active components of yew tree bark. Wall extracted paclitaxel from the bark of the Pacific yew (Taxus brevifolia) in 1967, with a yield of only 0.014%. Wani used the extracted paclitaxel to prepare single crystals, determining its chemical structure in 1971 through X-ray scattering techniques. In 1979, biologist Susan Band Horwitz identified paclitaxel’s target as tubulin. In 1984, the National Cancer Institute conducted phase I clinical trials of paclitaxel, which showed excellent efficacy against breast cancer and ovarian cancer. In 1989, Robert Anthony Holton of Florida State University extracted paclitaxel’s precursor, 10-deacetylbaccatin (10-DBA), from the leaves of the European yew, with a yield of about 0.1%, and used it for semi-synthetic production of paclitaxel, addressing the issue of insufficient natural paclitaxel yield.

In the late 1990s, Ciba-Geigy (which merged with Sandoz in 1996 to form Novartis) developed the first molecularly targeted antineoplastic drug, imatinib, through targeted screening. In June 1998, imatinib entered phase I clinical trials, and within weeks, the white blood cell counts of the 31 participating patients returned to normal. Just 32 months later, Novartis submitted a new drug application globally, and on March 27, 2001, the FDA granted it priority review status. On May 10, 2001, imatinib was approved for market by the FDA before completing phase III clinical trials, with the approval process being twice as fast as for similar drugs. The successful development of imatinib pioneered a new model for the development of targeted antineoplastic drugs.

== Classification ==
The variety of antineoplastic drugs used in clinical practice is extensive and rapidly evolving, with classification not yet fully standardized. Generally, they are categorized based on their pharmacological actions and targets.

=== General classification ===
Cytotoxic drugs	Drugs directly acting on DNA	Alkylating agents (nitrogen mustards, aziridines, mesylate, nitrosourea, etc.); Metal platinum complexes; Bleomycins; DNA topoisomerase inhibitors (drugs acting on DNA topoisomerase 1, drugs acting on DNA topoisomerase 2-beta)
Cytotoxic drugs	Drugs interfering with DNA Synthesis (Antimetabolites)	Folic acid antagonists; Pyrimidine antagonists (uracil derivatives, cytosine derivatives); Purine antagonists; Multi-target antagonists
Cytotoxic drugs	Drugs acting on structural proteins	Drugs inhibiting tubulin polymerization (drugs with one binding site on tubulin, drugs with two binding sites on tubulin); Drugs inhibiting tubulin depolymerization; Drugs interfering with ribonucleoprotein function; Drugs affecting amino acid supply
Non-Cytotoxic Drugs	Molecularly targeted drugs	Small-molecule kinase inhibitors; Proteasome inhibitors; Histone deacetylase inhibitors; Monoclonal antibody drugs; Antisense oligonucleotide drugs
Non-Cytotoxic Drugs	Other antineoplastic drugs	Drugs regulating hormone balance; Drugs with other antineoplastic mechanisms

=== Specific drug types ===
Classification and pharmacological toxicology of antineoplastic drugs
English name (Alias)	Indications and other uses	Mechanism of action	Side effects
I. Drugs directly acting on DNA
1. Alkylating agents
Nitrogen mustards			Damage to bone marrow cells, causing bone marrow suppression; Damage to intestinal epithelial cells, causing nausea and vomiting; Damage to hair epidermal cells, causing hair loss; Damage to germ cells
Chlormethine	Lymphoma, Hodgkin lymphoma	The nitrogen atom in nitrogen mustard drugs is highly basic and, under physiological pH, reacts with the β-chlorine atom to form highly reactive aziridinium ions, which are strong electrophilic alkylating agents. These ions undergo alkylation reactions with nucleophilic groups in DNA, RNA, or proteins, forming cross-links or causing depurination, leading to DNA strand breaks. During subsequent replication, base-pair mismatches occur, damaging DNA structure or function.	Damage to bone marrow cells, causing bone marrow suppression; Damage to intestinal epithelial cells, causing nausea and vomiting; Damage to hair epidermal cells, causing hair loss; Damage to germ cells
Nitrogen mustards	Lymphoma, Hodgkin lymphoma	The nitrogen atom in nitrogen mustard drugs is highly basic and, under physiological pH, reacts with the β-chlorine atom to form highly reactive aziridinium ions, which are strong electrophilic alkylating agents. These ions undergo alkylation reactions with nucleophilic groups in DNA, RNA, or proteins, forming cross-links or causing depurination, leading to DNA strand breaks. During subsequent replication, base-pair mismatches occur, damaging DNA structure or function.	Damage to bone marrow cells, causing bone marrow suppression; Damage to intestinal epithelial cells, causing nausea and vomiting; Damage to hair epidermal cells, causing hair loss; Damage to germ cells
Chlorambucil (Leukeran)	Chronic lymphocytic leukemia, lymphoma, Hodgkin lymphoma, ovarian cancer, etc.	The nitrogen atom in nitrogen mustard drugs is highly basic and, under physiological pH, reacts with the β-chlorine atom to form highly reactive aziridinium ions, which are strong electrophilic alkylating agents. These ions undergo alkylation reactions with nucleophilic groups in DNA, RNA, or proteins, forming cross-links or causing depurination, leading to DNA strand breaks. During subsequent replication, base-pair mismatches occur, damaging DNA structure or function.	Damage to bone marrow cells, causing bone marrow suppression; Damage to intestinal epithelial cells, causing nausea and vomiting; Damage to hair epidermal cells, causing hair loss; Damage to germ cells
Melphalan	Ovarian cancer, breast cancer, lymphoma, multiple myeloma, etc.	The nitrogen atom in nitrogen mustard drugs is highly basic and, under physiological pH, reacts with the β-chlorine atom to form highly reactive aziridinium ions, which are strong electrophilic alkylating agents. These ions undergo alkylation reactions with nucleophilic groups in DNA, RNA, or proteins, forming cross-links or causing depurination, leading to DNA strand breaks. During subsequent replication, base-pair mismatches occur, damaging DNA structure or function.	Damage to bone marrow cells, causing bone marrow suppression; Damage to intestinal epithelial cells, causing nausea and vomiting; Damage to hair epidermal cells, causing hair loss; Damage to germ cells
Uramustine	Ovarian cancer, breast cancer, lymphoma, multiple myeloma, etc.	The nitrogen atom in nitrogen mustard drugs is highly basic and, under physiological pH, reacts with the β-chlorine atom to form highly reactive aziridinium ions, which are strong electrophilic alkylating agents. These ions undergo alkylation reactions with nucleophilic groups in DNA, RNA, or proteins, forming cross-links or causing depurination, leading to DNA strand breaks. During subsequent replication, base-pair mismatches occur, damaging DNA structure or function.	Damage to bone marrow cells, causing bone marrow suppression; Damage to intestinal epithelial cells, causing nausea and vomiting; Damage to hair epidermal cells, causing hair loss; Damage to germ cells
Formylmelphalan	Seminoma, lymphoma, multiple myeloma, etc.	The nitrogen atom in nitrogen mustard drugs is highly basic and, under physiological pH, reacts with the β-chlorine atom to form highly reactive aziridinium ions, which are strong electrophilic alkylating agents. These ions undergo alkylation reactions with nucleophilic groups in DNA, RNA, or proteins, forming cross-links or causing depurination, leading to DNA strand breaks. During subsequent replication, base-pair mismatches occur, damaging DNA structure or function.	Damage to bone marrow cells, causing bone marrow suppression; Damage to intestinal epithelial cells, causing nausea and vomiting; Damage to hair epidermal cells, causing hair loss; Damage to germ cells
Cyclophosphamide (CTX)	Lymphoma, acute lymphoblastic leukemia, multiple myeloma, lung cancer, neuroblastoma, etc.	The nitrogen atom in nitrogen mustard drugs is highly basic and, under physiological pH, reacts with the β-chlorine atom to form highly reactive aziridinium ions, which are strong electrophilic alkylating agents. These ions undergo alkylation reactions with nucleophilic groups in DNA, RNA, or proteins, forming cross-links or causing depurination, leading to DNA strand breaks. During subsequent replication, base-pair mismatches occur, damaging DNA structure or function.	Damage to bone marrow cells, causing bone marrow suppression; Damage to intestinal epithelial cells, causing nausea and vomiting; Damage to hair epidermal cells, causing hair loss; Damage to germ cells
Ifosfamide (IFO)	Testicular cancer, lymphoma, sarcoma, bladder cancer, etc.	The nitrogen atom in nitrogen mustard drugs is highly basic and, under physiological pH, reacts with the β-chlorine atom to form highly reactive aziridinium ions, which are strong electrophilic alkylating agents. These ions undergo alkylation reactions with nucleophilic groups in DNA, RNA, or proteins, forming cross-links or causing depurination, leading to DNA strand breaks. During subsequent replication, base-pair mismatches occur, damaging DNA structure or function.	Damage to bone marrow cells, causing bone marrow suppression; Damage to intestinal epithelial cells, causing nausea and vomiting; Damage to hair epidermal cells, causing hair loss; Damage to germ cells
Chlorophosphamide	Hodgkin lymphoma, chronic lymphocytic leukemia, etc.	The nitrogen atom in nitrogen mustard drugs is highly basic and, under physiological pH, reacts with the β-chlorine atom to form highly reactive aziridinium ions, which are strong electrophilic alkylating agents. These ions undergo alkylation reactions with nucleophilic groups in DNA, RNA, or proteins, forming cross-links or causing depurination, leading to DNA strand breaks. During subsequent replication, base-pair mismatches occur, damaging DNA structure or function.	Damage to bone marrow cells, causing bone marrow suppression; Damage to intestinal epithelial cells, causing nausea and vomiting; Damage to hair epidermal cells, causing hair loss; Damage to germ cells
Aziridines			Damage to bone marrow cells, causing bone marrow suppression; Damage to intestinal epithelial cells, causing nausea and vomiting; Damage to hair epidermal cells, causing hair loss; Damage to germ cells
Thiotepa	Ovarian cancer, breast cancer, liver cancer, bladder cancer, etc.	Similar to nitrogen mustards, acting as active intermediates formed after nitrogen mustard metabolism.	Damage to bone marrow cells, causing bone marrow suppression; Damage to intestinal epithelial cells, causing nausea and vomiting; Damage to hair epidermal cells, causing hair loss; Damage to germ cells
Mitomycin C	Various adenocarcinomas such as stomach cancer, breast cancer, pancreatic cancer, etc.	Similar to nitrogen mustards, acting as active intermediates formed after nitrogen mustard metabolism.	Damage to bone marrow cells, causing bone marrow suppression; Damage to intestinal epithelial cells, causing nausea and vomiting; Damage to hair epidermal cells, causing hair loss; Damage to germ cells
Nitrosoureas			Damage to bone marrow cells, causing bone marrow suppression; Damage to intestinal epithelial cells, causing nausea and vomiting; Damage to hair epidermal cells, causing hair loss; Damage to germ cells
Carmustine (BCNU)	Brain tumor, metastatic tumor, etc.	In nitrosoureas, the presence of the N-nitroso group destabilizes the bond between the nitrogen atom and the adjacent carbonyl group, decomposing under physiological conditions to form electrophilic groups that undergo alkylation reactions with DNA bases and phosphate groups.	Damage to bone marrow cells, causing bone marrow suppression; Damage to intestinal epithelial cells, causing nausea and vomiting; Damage to hair epidermal cells, causing hair loss; Damage to germ cells
Lomustine (CCNU)	Brain tumor, metastatic tumor, etc.	In nitrosoureas, the presence of the N-nitroso group destabilizes the bond between the nitrogen atom and the adjacent carbonyl group, decomposing under physiological conditions to form electrophilic groups that undergo alkylation reactions with DNA bases and phosphate groups.	Damage to bone marrow cells, causing bone marrow suppression; Damage to intestinal epithelial cells, causing nausea and vomiting; Damage to hair epidermal cells, causing hair loss; Damage to germ cells
Semustine (Me-CCNU)	Brain tumor, stomach cancer, colorectal cancer, lung cancer, etc.	In nitrosoureas, the presence of the N-nitroso group destabilizes the bond between the nitrogen atom and the adjacent carbonyl group, decomposing under physiological conditions to form electrophilic groups that undergo alkylation reactions with DNA bases and phosphate groups.	Damage to bone marrow cells, causing bone marrow suppression; Damage to intestinal epithelial cells, causing nausea and vomiting; Damage to hair epidermal cells, causing hair loss; Damage to germ cells
Nimustine (ACNU)	Brain tumor, stomach cancer, colorectal cancer, lung cancer, Hodgkin lymphoma, etc.	In nitrosoureas, the presence of the N-nitroso group destabilizes the bond between the nitrogen atom and the adjacent carbonyl group, decomposing under physiological conditions to form electrophilic groups that undergo alkylation reactions with DNA bases and phosphate groups.	Damage to bone marrow cells, causing bone marrow suppression; Damage to intestinal epithelial cells, causing nausea and vomiting; Damage to hair epidermal cells, causing hair loss; Damage to germ cells
Ranimustine	Glioblastoma, multiple myeloma, chronic myelogenous leukemia, Hodgkin lymphoma, etc.	In nitrosoureas, the presence of the N-nitroso group destabilizes the bond between the nitrogen atom and the adjacent carbonyl group, decomposing under physiological conditions to form electrophilic groups that undergo alkylation reactions with DNA bases and phosphate groups.	Damage to bone marrow cells, causing bone marrow suppression; Damage to intestinal epithelial cells, causing nausea and vomiting; Damage to hair epidermal cells, causing hair loss; Damage to germ cells
Streptozotocin	Islet cell tumor, etc.	In nitrosoureas, the presence of the N-nitroso group destabilizes the bond between the nitrogen atom and the adjacent carbonyl group, decomposing under physiological conditions to form electrophilic groups that undergo alkylation reactions with DNA bases and phosphate groups.	Damage to bone marrow cells, causing bone marrow suppression; Damage to intestinal epithelial cells, causing nausea and vomiting; Damage to hair epidermal cells, causing hair loss; Damage to germ cells
Chlorozotocin	Islet cell tumor, etc.	In nitrosoureas, the presence of the N-nitroso group destabilizes the bond between the nitrogen atom and the adjacent carbonyl group, decomposing under physiological conditions to form electrophilic groups that undergo alkylation reactions with DNA bases and phosphate groups.	Damage to bone marrow cells, causing bone marrow suppression; Damage to intestinal epithelial cells, causing nausea and vomiting; Damage to hair epidermal cells, causing hair loss; Damage to germ cells
Mesylate (methyl sulfonates)			Damage to bone marrow cells, causing bone marrow suppression; Damage to intestinal epithelial cells, causing nausea and vomiting; Damage to hair epidermal cells, causing hair loss; Damage to germ cells
Busulfan	Chronic myelogenous leukemia, myeloproliferative disorders, etc.	Binds to guanine in DNA, causing intramolecular cross-linking, and undergoes dialkylation with thiol groups in amino acids.	Damage to bone marrow cells, causing bone marrow suppression; Damage to intestinal epithelial cells, causing nausea and vomiting; Damage to hair epidermal cells, causing hair loss; Damage to germ cells
Other alkylating agents			Damage to bone marrow cells, causing bone marrow suppression; Damage to intestinal epithelial cells, causing nausea and vomiting; Damage to hair epidermal cells, causing hair loss; Damage to germ cells
Altretamine	Combination chemotherapy for ovarian cancer, small cell lung cancer, etc.	Metabolized to produce active N-(hydroxymethyl)melamine, which further demethylates in cells to form electrophilic groups that alkylate DNA.	Damage to bone marrow cells, causing bone marrow suppression; Damage to intestinal epithelial cells, causing nausea and vomiting; Damage to hair epidermal cells, causing hair loss; Damage to germ cells
Procarbazine	Hodgkin lymphoma, multiple myeloma, melanoma, etc.	Metabolized to release methyl cations that alkylate DNA, while other metabolites, structurally similar to intermediates in purine biosynthesis, interfere with purine biosynthesis.	Damage to bone marrow cells, causing bone marrow suppression; Damage to intestinal epithelial cells, causing nausea and vomiting; Damage to hair epidermal cells, causing hair loss; Damage to germ cells
Dacarbazine	Melanoma, Hodgkin lymphoma, etc.	Metabolized to release methyl cations that alkylate DNA, while other metabolites interfere with purine biosynthesis.	Damage to bone marrow cells, causing bone marrow suppression; Damage to intestinal epithelial cells, causing nausea and vomiting; Damage to hair epidermal cells, causing hair loss; Damage to germ cells
Trabectedin (Yondelis)	Soft-tissue sarcoma	A special alkylating agent that acts on the grooves between DNA double helices, interfering with cell division and DNA repair by binding to DNA, thereby promoting tumor cell apoptosis.	Damage to bone marrow cells, causing bone marrow suppression; Damage to intestinal epithelial cells, causing nausea and vomiting; Damage to hair epidermal cells, causing hair loss; Damage to germ cells
2. Metal platinum complexes
Cisplatin (DDP)	Non-spermatogonia testicular cancer, ovarian cancer, etc., with a broad antitumor spectrum	Platinum complexes hydrolyze into hydrates upon entering tumor cells, forming a closed five-membered chelate ring by coordinating with the N-7 position of two guanine bases in DNA, disrupting hydrogen bonds between purine and cytosine bases on nucleotide chains, altering the normal double-helix structure of DNA, causing local denaturation and loss of replication ability.	Damage to bone marrow cells, causing bone marrow suppression; Kidney toxicity; Ear toxicity; Neurotoxicity; Gastrointestinal tract toxicity
Carboplatin (CBP)	Non-spermatogonia testicular cancer, ovarian cancer, etc., with a broad antitumor spectrum	Platinum complexes hydrolyze into hydrates upon entering tumor cells, forming a closed five-membered chelate ring by coordinating with the N-7 position of two guanine bases in DNA, disrupting hydrogen bonds between purine and cytosine bases on nucleotide chains, altering the normal double-helix structure of DNA, causing local denaturation and loss of replication ability.	Damage to bone marrow cells, causing bone marrow suppression; Kidney toxicity; Ear toxicity; Neurotoxicity; Gastrointestinal tract toxicity
Oxaliplatin	Non-spermatogonia testicular cancer, ovarian cancer, etc., with a broad antitumor spectrum	Platinum complexes hydrolyze into hydrates upon entering tumor cells, forming a closed five-membered chelate ring by coordinating with the N-7 position of two guanine bases in DNA, disrupting hydrogen bonds between purine and cytosine bases on nucleotide chains, altering the normal double-helix structure of DNA, causing local denaturation and loss of replication ability.	Damage to bone marrow cells, causing bone marrow suppression; Kidney toxicity; Ear toxicity; Neurotoxicity; Gastrointestinal tract toxicity
Nedaplatin	Non-spermatogonia testicular cancer, ovarian cancer, etc., with a broad antitumor spectrum	Platinum complexes hydrolyze into hydrates upon entering tumor cells, forming a closed five-membered chelate ring by coordinating with the N-7 position of two guanine bases in DNA, disrupting hydrogen bonds between purine and cytosine bases on nucleotide chains, altering the normal double-helix structure of DNA, causing local denaturation and loss of replication ability.	Damage to bone marrow cells, causing bone marrow suppression; Kidney toxicity; Ear toxicity; Neurotoxicity; Gastrointestinal tract toxicity
3. Bleomycins
Bleomycin (BLM)	Squamous-cell carcinoma (head and neck, upper digestive tract, reproductive system, etc.), combination therapy for lymphoma, etc.	The chemical structure of bleomycin drugs includes a left portion with multiple amino acids, sugars, pyrimidine rings, and imidazole, and a right portion with a planar bithiazole ring. When interacting with DNA, the left portion forms a chelate with ferrous ions, activating the drug and binding to the C-4' of thymidine deoxynucleotide in DNA, causing DNA strand breaks; the right portion binds to specific parts of DNA’s minor groove, leading to DNA cleavage.	Lung toxicity
Pingyangmycin (PYM)	Squamous-cell carcinoma (head and neck), combination therapy for lymphoma, breast cancer, etc.	The chemical structure of bleomycin drugs includes a left portion with multiple amino acids, sugars, pyrimidine rings, and imidazole, and a right portion with a planar bithiazole ring. When interacting with DNA, the left portion forms a chelate with ferrous ions, activating the drug and binding to the C-4' of thymidine deoxynucleotide in DNA, causing DNA strand breaks; the right portion binds to specific parts of DNA’s minor groove, leading to DNA cleavage.	Lung toxicity
4. DNA topoisomerase inhibitors
Drugs acting on topoisomerase (Topo I)			Gastrointestinal tract toxicity; Heart toxicity; Bone marrow suppression; Hair loss
Camptothecin (CPT)	Gastrointestinal tumors, liver cancer, bladder cancer, leukemia, etc.	Primarily camptothecin-based drugs, whose chemical structure contains a β-hydroxy lactone ring that reacts with topoisomerase, preventing the DNA single-strand break-rejoining reaction, thus inhibiting DNA transcription, replication, and cell mitosis.	Gastrointestinal tract toxicity; Heart toxicity; Bone marrow suppression; Hair loss
Irinotecan (CPT-11)	Lung cancer, colorectal cancer, ovarian cancer, uterine cancer, leukemia, etc.	Primarily camptothecin-based drugs, whose chemical structure contains a β-hydroxy lactone ring that reacts with topoisomerase, preventing the DNA single-strand break-rejoining reaction, thus inhibiting DNA transcription, replication, and cell mitosis.	Gastrointestinal tract toxicity; Heart toxicity; Bone marrow suppression; Hair loss
Topotecan	Small-.cell lung cancer, colorectal cancer, breast cancer, etc.	Primarily camptothecin-based drugs, whose chemical structure contains a β-hydroxy lactone ring that reacts with topoisomerase, preventing the DNA single-strand break-rejoining reaction, thus inhibiting DNA transcription, replication, and cell mitosis.	Gastrointestinal tract toxicity; Heart toxicity; Bone marrow suppression; Hair loss
Rubitecan	Small-cell lung cancer, colorectal cancer, breast cancer, etc.	Primarily camptothecin-based drugs, whose chemical structure contains a β-hydroxy lactone ring that reacts with topoisomerase, preventing the DNA single-strand break-rejoining reaction, thus inhibiting DNA transcription, replication, and cell mitosis.	Gastrointestinal tract toxicity; Heart toxicity; Bone marrow suppression; Hair loss
Drugs acting on toposoimerase 2 (Topo II)			Gastrointestinal tract toxicity; Heart toxicity; Bone marrow suppression; Hair loss
Dactinomycin (DACT)	Malignant hydatidiform mole, Hodgkin lymphoma, choriocarcinoma, kidney cancer	Its planar phenoxazinone core binds to DNA, while inhibiting toposoimerase 2.	Gastrointestinal tract toxicity; Heart toxicity; Bone marrow suppression; Hair loss
Doxorubicin (Adriamycin, ADM)	Drug-resistant acute lymphoblastic leukemia, Hodgkin lymphoma, breast cancer, stomach cancer, etc.	The drug’s anthracycline or anthraquinone structure intercalates between DNA C-G base pairs, rigidifying the DNA-toposoimerase 2 complex, ultimately causing DNA strand breaks.	Gastrointestinal tract toxicity; Heart toxicity; Bone marrow suppression; Hair loss
Daunorubicin (Daunomycin, DRN)	Drug-resistant acute lymphoblastic leukemia, Hodgkin lymphoma, breast cancer, stomach cancer, etc.	The drug’s anthracycline or anthraquinone structure intercalates between DNA C-G base pairs, rigidifying the DNA-toposoimerase 2 complex, ultimately causing DNA strand breaks.	Gastrointestinal tract toxicity; Heart toxicity; Bone marrow suppression; Hair loss
Epirubicin	Drug-resistant acute lymphoblastic leukemia, Hodgkin lymphoma, breast cancer, stomach cancer, etc.	The drug’s anthracycline or anthraquinone structure intercalates between DNA C-G base pairs, rigidifying the DNA-toposoimerase 2 complex, ultimately causing DNA strand breaks.	Gastrointestinal tract toxicity; Heart toxicity; Bone marrow suppression; Hair loss
Zorubicin	Drug-resistant acute lymphoblastic leukemia, Hodgkin lymphoma, breast cancer, stomach cancer, etc.	The drug’s anthracycline or anthraquinone structure intercalates between DNA C-G base pairs, rigidifying the DNA-toposoimerase 2 complex, ultimately causing DNA strand breaks.	Gastrointestinal tract toxicity; Heart toxicity; Bone marrow suppression; Hair loss
Aclacinomicin A	Drug-resistant acute lymphoblastic leukemia, Hodgkin lymphoma, breast cancer, stomach cancer, etc.	The drug’s anthracycline or anthraquinone structure intercalates between DNA C-G base pairs, rigidifying the DNA-toposoimerase 2 complex, ultimately causing DNA strand breaks.	Gastrointestinal tract toxicity; Heart toxicity; Bone marrow suppression; Hair loss
Pirarubicin	Drug-resistant acute lymphoblastic leukemia, Hodgkin lymphoma, breast cancer, stomach cancer, etc.	The drug’s anthracycline or anthraquinone structure intercalates between DNA C-G base pairs, rigidifying the DNA-toposoimerase 2 complex, ultimately causing DNA strand breaks.	Gastrointestinal tract toxicity; Heart toxicity; Bone marrow suppression; Hair loss
Amsacrine (AMSA)	Drug-resistant acute lymphoblastic leukemia, Hodgkin lymphoma, breast cancer, stomach cancer, etc.	The drug’s anthracycline or anthraquinone structure intercalates between DNA C-G base pairs, rigidifying the DNA-toposoimerase 2 complex, ultimately causing DNA strand breaks.	Gastrointestinal tract toxicity; Heart toxicity; Bone marrow suppression; Hair loss
Mitoxantrone (NVT)	Advanced breast cancer, relapsed non-Hodgkin lymphoma, etc.	The drug’s anthracycline or anthraquinone structure intercalates between DNA C-G base pairs, rigidifying the DNA-toposoimerase 2 complex, ultimately causing DNA strand breaks.	Gastrointestinal tract toxicity; Heart toxicity; Bone marrow suppression; Hair loss
Pixantrone	Advanced breast cancer, relapsed non-Hodgkin lymphoma, etc.	The drug’s anthracycline or anthraquinone structure intercalates between DNA C-G base pairs, rigidifying the DNA-toposoimerase 2 complex, ultimately causing DNA strand breaks.	Gastrointestinal tract toxicity; Heart toxicity; Bone marrow suppression; Hair loss
Etoposide (VePesid, VP16)	Lung cancer, testicular cancer	A group obtained through epimerization at position 4 directly interacts with toposoimerase 2, preventing DNA replication and transcription.	Gastrointestinal tract toxicity; Heart toxicity; Bone marrow suppression; Hair loss
Teniposide (VM-26)	Lung cancer, testicular cancer, etc.	A group obtained through epimerization at position 4 directly interacts with toposoimerase 2, preventing DNA replication and transcription.	Gastrointestinal tract toxicity; Heart toxicity; Bone marrow suppression; Hair loss
Amonafide (BIDA)	Small-cell lung cancer	A toposoimerase 2 inhibitor, selectively blocking DNA replication.	Gastrointestinal tract toxicity; Heart toxicity; Bone marrow suppression; Hair loss
II. Drugs interfering with DNA synthesis
1. Folic acid antagonists
Methotrexate (Amethopterine, MTX)	Acute leukemia, choriocarcinoma, etc.	Structurally similar to dihydrofolic acid, it acts on dihydrofolate reductase, preventing the conversion of dihydrofolic acid to tetrahydrofolic acid, affecting coenzyme F production and interfering with thymidylate and purine nucleotide synthesis.	Bone marrow suppression; Tetrahydrofolic acid deficiency
Aminopterin	Acute leukemia, choriocarcinoma, etc.	Structurally similar to dihydrofolic acid, it acts on dihydrofolate reductase, preventing the conversion of dihydrofolic acid to tetrahydrofolic acid, affecting coenzyme F production and interfering with thymidylate and purine nucleotide synthesis.	Bone marrow suppression; Tetrahydrofolic acid deficiency
2. Pyrimidine antagonists
Uracil derivatives			Bone marrow suppression; Gastrointestinal tract toxicity; Liver toxicity; Some drugs cause vein inflammation when administered intravenously
5-Fluorouracil (5-FU)	Acute leukemia, choriocarcinoma, etc.	These drugs are metabolized in the body to 5-fluorodeoxyuridine monophosphate, which binds to thymine synthase and interacts with coenzyme 5,10-methylenetetrahydrofolic acid. The stable C-F bond prevents effective thymidylate deoxynucleotide synthesis, inhibiting DNA synthesis.	Bone marrow suppression; Gastrointestinal tract toxicity; Liver toxicity; Some drugs cause vein inflammation when administered intravenously
Tegafur (Ftorafur)	Acute leukemia, choriocarcinoma, etc.	These drugs are metabolized in the body to 5-fluorodeoxyuridine monophosphate, which binds to thymine synthase and interacts with coenzyme 5,10-methylenetetrahydrofolic acid. The stable C-F bond prevents effective thymidylate deoxynucleotide synthesis, inhibiting DNA synthesis.	Bone marrow suppression; Gastrointestinal tract toxicity; Liver toxicity; Some drugs cause vein inflammation when administered intravenously
Difuradin	Acute leukemia, choriocarcinoma, etc.	These drugs are metabolized in the body to 5-fluorodeoxyuridine monophosphate, which binds to thymine synthase and interacts with coenzyme 5,10-methylenetetrahydrofolic acid. The stable C-F bond prevents effective thymidylate deoxynucleotide synthesis, inhibiting DNA synthesis.	Bone marrow suppression; Gastrointestinal tract toxicity; Liver toxicity; Some drugs cause vein inflammation when administered intravenously
Doxifluridine (5'-dFUR)	Stomach cancer, colorectal cancer, breast cancer, etc.	These drugs are metabolized in the body to 5-fluorodeoxyuridine monophosphate, which binds to thymine synthase and interacts with coenzyme 5,10-methylenetetrahydrofolic acid. The stable C-F bond prevents effective thymidylate deoxynucleotide synthesis, inhibiting DNA synthesis.	Bone marrow suppression; Gastrointestinal tract toxicity; Liver toxicity; Some drugs cause vein inflammation when administered intravenously
Carmofur	Stomach cancer, colorectal cancer, breast cancer, etc.	These drugs are metabolized in the body to 5-fluorodeoxyuridine monophosphate, which binds to thymine synthase and interacts with coenzyme 5,10-methylenetetrahydrofolic acid. The stable C-F bond prevents effective thymidylate deoxynucleotide synthesis, inhibiting DNA synthesis.	Bone marrow suppression; Gastrointestinal tract toxicity; Liver toxicity; Some drugs cause vein inflammation when administered intravenously
Cytosine derivatives			Bone marrow suppression; Gastrointestinal tract toxicity; Liver toxicity; Some drugs cause vein inflammation when administered intravenously
Cytarabine (Ara-C)	Acute myelogenous leukemia, monocytic leukemia, etc.	Similar to uracil derivatives, inhibiting DNA polymerase.	Bone marrow suppression; Gastrointestinal tract toxicity; Liver toxicity; Some drugs cause vein inflammation when administered intravenously
Enocitabine	Acute myelogenous leukemia, monocytic leukemia, etc.	Similar to uracil derivatives, inhibiting DNA polymerase.	Bone marrow suppression; Gastrointestinal tract toxicity; Liver toxicity; Some drugs cause vein inflammation when administered intravenously
Cyclocytidine	Various acute leukemias, anti-herpes simplex virus (as an antiviral drug), etc.	Similar to uracil derivatives, inhibiting DNA polymerase.	Bone marrow suppression; Gastrointestinal tract toxicity; Liver toxicity; Some drugs cause vein inflammation when administered intravenously
Gemcitabine	Pancreatic cancer, advanced small cell lung cancer, etc.	Similar to uracil derivatives, inhibiting DNA polymerase.	Bone marrow suppression; Gastrointestinal tract toxicity; Liver toxicity; Some drugs cause vein inflammation when administered intravenously
Decitabine	Various acute leukemias	Inhibits DNA methyltransferase (DNMT).	Bone marrow suppression; Gastrointestinal tract toxicity; Liver toxicity; Some drugs cause vein inflammation when administered intravenously
3. Purine antagonists
Mercaptopurine (6-MP)	Maintenance therapy for acute lymphoblastic leukemia, choriocarcinoma, etc.	These drugs are enzymatically converted to 6-thioinosinic acid, inhibiting adenylosuccinate synthetase, preventing inosinic acid conversion to adenosine monophosphate; they also inhibit inosinate dehydrogenase, preventing inosinic acid oxidation to xanthine nucleotide, thus inhibiting DNA and RNA synthesis.	Bone marrow suppression; Gastrointestinal tract mucosal damage; Occasional liver toxicity
Sulfomercaptopurine Sodium	Maintenance therapy for acute lymphoblastic leukemia, choriocarcinoma, etc.	These drugs are enzymatically converted to 6-thioinosinic acid, inhibiting adenylosuccinate synthetase, preventing inosinic acid conversion to adenosine monophosphate; they also inhibit inosinate dehydrogenase, preventing inosinic acid oxidation to xanthine nucleotide, thus inhibiting DNA and RNA synthesis.	Bone marrow suppression; Gastrointestinal tract mucosal damage; Occasional liver toxicity
Azathioprine (6-AP)	Leukemia (discontinued), lupus erythematosus, organ transplant (as an immunosuppressant), etc.	These drugs are enzymatically converted to 6-thioinosinic acid, inhibiting adenylosuccinate synthetase, preventing inosinic acid conversion to adenosine monophosphate; they also inhibit inosinate dehydrogenase, preventing inosinic acid oxidation to xanthine nucleotide, thus inhibiting DNA and RNA synthesis.	Bone marrow suppression; Gastrointestinal tract mucosal damage; Occasional liver toxicity
6-Tioguanine (6-TG)	Combination therapy for leukemia, etc.	These drugs are enzymatically converted to 6-thioinosinic acid, inhibiting adenylosuccinate synthetase, preventing inosinic acid conversion to adenosine monophosphate; they also inhibit inosinate dehydrogenase, preventing inosinic acid oxidation to xanthine nucleotide, thus inhibiting DNA and RNA synthesis.	Bone marrow suppression; Gastrointestinal tract mucosal damage; Occasional liver toxicity
Pentostatin	Combination therapy for leukemia, etc.	These drugs are enzymatically converted to 6-thioinosinic acid, inhibiting adenylosuccinate synthetase, preventing inosinic acid conversion to adenosine monophosphate; they also inhibit inosinate dehydrogenase, preventing inosinic acid oxidation to xanthine nucleotide, thus inhibiting DNA and RNA synthesis.	Bone marrow suppression; Gastrointestinal tract mucosal damage; Occasional liver toxicity
Fludarabine	Cutaneous T-cell lymphoma, chronic lymphocytic leukemia, non-Hodgkin lymphoma, etc.	These drugs are enzymatically converted to 6-thioinosinic acid, inhibiting adenylosuccinate synthetase, preventing inosinic acid conversion to adenosine monophosphate; they also inhibit inosinate dehydrogenase, preventing inosinic acid oxidation to xanthine nucleotide, thus inhibiting DNA and RNA synthesis.	Bone marrow suppression; Gastrointestinal tract mucosal damage; Occasional liver toxicity
Cladribine	Cutaneous T-cell lymphoma, chronic lymphocytic leukemia, non-Hodgkin lymphoma, etc.	These drugs are enzymatically converted to 6-thioinosinic acid, inhibiting adenylosuccinate synthetase, preventing inosinic acid conversion to adenosine monophosphate; they also inhibit inosinate dehydrogenase, preventing inosinic acid oxidation to xanthine nucleotide, thus inhibiting DNA and RNA synthesis.	Bone marrow suppression; Gastrointestinal tract mucosal damage; Occasional liver toxicity
Nelarabine	T-cell acute lymphoblastic leukemia, T-cell lymphoma	These drugs are enzymatically converted to 6-thioinosinic acid, inhibiting adenylosuccinate synthetase, preventing inosinic acid conversion to adenosine monophosphate; they also inhibit inosinate dehydrogenase, preventing inosinic acid oxidation to xanthine nucleotide, thus inhibiting DNA and RNA synthesis.	Bone marrow suppression; Gastrointestinal tract mucosal damage; Occasional liver toxicity
4. Multi-target antagonists and other antimetabolites
Raltitrexed	Advanced colorectal cancer, etc.	Combines the effects of folic acid antagonists and uracil derivative drugs.	Bone marrow suppression; Tetrahydrofolic acid deficiency
Pemetrexed	Non-small-cell lung cancer, drug-resistant mesothelioma	Combines the effects of folic acid antagonists and uracil derivative drugs.	Bone marrow suppression; Tetrahydrofolic acid deficiency
Hydroxycarbamide (Hydroxyurea, HU)	Chronic myelogenous leukemia, head and neck cancer, ovarian cancer, etc.	Inhibits nucleotide reductase, preventing cytidine monophosphate conversion to deoxycytidine monophosphate, thus inhibiting DNA synthesis, selectively acting on S-phase cells.	Bone marrow suppression; Gastrointestinal tract toxicity
III. Drugs acting on structural proteins
1. Drugs inhibiting tubulin polymerization
Drugs with one binding site on tubulin			Bone marrow suppression; Neurotoxicity; Gastrointestinal tract toxicity; Hair loss
Colchicine	Breast cancer (discontinued), gout, rheumatoid arthritis (as an immunosuppressant), etc.	The seven-membered fused ring in the drug’s structure binds to a site between the α and β subunits of the tubulin dimer, blocking cell division.	Bone marrow suppression; Neurotoxicity; Gastrointestinal tract toxicity; Hair loss
Drugs with two binding sites on tubulin			Bone marrow suppression; Neurotoxicity; Gastrointestinal tract toxicity; Hair loss
Vinblastine (VLB)	Various solid tumors	The dimeric indole structure binds to undamaged tubulin at the “growth end,” with a low-affinity site on the microtubule wall, causing microtubules to aggregate into clusters within cells, halting tumor cells in metaphase.	Bone marrow suppression; Neurotoxicity; Gastrointestinal tract toxicity; Hair loss
Vincristine (VCR)	Pediatric acute leukemia, etc.	The dimeric indole structure binds to undamaged tubulin at the “growth end,” with a low-affinity site on the microtubule wall, causing microtubules to aggregate into clusters within cells, halting tumor cells in metaphase.	Bone marrow suppression; Neurotoxicity; Gastrointestinal tract toxicity; Hair loss
Vindesine (VDS)	Acute lymphoblastic leukemia, chronic myelogenous leukemia, etc.	The dimeric indole structure binds to undamaged tubulin at the “growth end,” with a low-affinity site on the microtubule wall, causing microtubules to aggregate into clusters within cells, halting tumor cells in metaphase.	Bone marrow suppression; Neurotoxicity; Gastrointestinal tract toxicity; Hair loss
Vinorelbine (NRB)	Non-small-cell lung cancer, etc.	The dimeric indole structure binds to undamaged tubulin at the “growth end,” with a low-affinity site on the microtubule wall, causing microtubules to aggregate into clusters within cells, halting tumor cells in metaphase.	Bone marrow suppression; Neurotoxicity; Gastrointestinal tract toxicity; Hair loss
2. Drugs inhibiting tubulin depolymerization
Paclitaxel (Taxol)	Ovarian cancer, breast cancer, lung cancer, melanoma, etc.	Induces and promotes tubulin polymerization while inhibiting the depolymerization of formed microtubule bundles, producing stable microtubule bundles and disrupting their dynamic regeneration.	Bone marrow suppression; Neurotoxicity; Heart toxicity; Hypersensitivity reaction
Docetaxel (Taxotere)	Solid tumors except kidney cancer and colorectal cancer	Induces and promotes tubulin polymerization while inhibiting the depolymerization of formed microtubule bundles, producing stable microtubule bundles and disrupting their dynamic regeneration.	Bone marrow suppression; Neurotoxicity; Heart toxicity; Hypersensitivity reaction
3. Drugs interfering with ribonucleoprotein function
Harringtonine	Acute monocytic leukemia, chronic myelogenous leukemia, Hodgkin lymphoma, etc.	Inhibits the initial stage of protein synthesis, causing ribonucleoprotein breakdown.	Bone marrow suppression; Gastrointestinal tract reactions; Hair loss; Occasional heart toxicity
Homoharringtonine	Acute monocytic leukemia, chronic myelogenous leukemia, Hodgkin lymphoma, etc.	Inhibits the initial stage of protein synthesis, causing ribonucleoprotein breakdown.	Bone marrow suppression; Gastrointestinal tract reactions; Hair loss; Occasional heart toxicity
4. Drugs affecting amino acid supply
L-Asparaginase	Combination therapy for acute lymphoblastic leukemia, etc.	Hydrolyzes serum asparagine, depriving cancer cells of asparagine supply, inhibiting their growth.	Gastrointestinal tract reactions; Occasional hypersensitivity reaction
IV. Small-molecule kinase inhibitors
1. Single-target kinase inhibitors
Imatinib (Glivec, Gleevec)	Philadelphia chromosome-positive chronic myelogenous leukemia and gastrointestinal stromal tumor	Binds to the ATP site of Abl protein kinase, inhibiting kinase activity, preventing proliferation and inducing apoptosis in Bcr-Abl-positive cells.	Urinary retention; Gastrointestinal tract reactions; Muscle pain and fatigue; Circulatory system toxicity; Liver toxicity; Hypertension
Dasatinib (Sprycel)	Philadelphia chromosome-positive chronic myelogenous leukemia and gastrointestinal stromal tumor	Binds to the ATP site of Abl protein kinase, inhibiting kinase activity, preventing proliferation and inducing apoptosis in Bcr-Abl-positive cells.	Urinary retention; Gastrointestinal tract reactions; Muscle pain and fatigue; Circulatory system toxicity; Liver toxicity; Hypertension
Nilotinib (Tasigna)	Philadelphia chromosome-positive chronic myelogenous leukemia and gastrointestinal stromal tumor	Binds to the ATP site of Abl protein kinase, inhibiting kinase activity, preventing proliferation and inducing apoptosis in Bcr-Abl-positive cells.	Urinary retention; Gastrointestinal tract reactions; Muscle pain and fatigue; Circulatory system toxicity; Liver toxicity; Hypertension
Bosutinib	Philadelphia chromosome-positive chronic myelogenous leukemia and gastrointestinal stromal tumor	Binds to the ATP site of Abl protein kinase, inhibiting kinase activity, preventing proliferation and inducing apoptosis in Bcr-Abl-positive cells.	Urinary retention; Gastrointestinal tract reactions; Muscle pain and fatigue; Circulatory system toxicity; Liver toxicity; Hypertension
Ponatinib	Philadelphia chromosome-positive chronic myelogenous leukemia and gastrointestinal stromal tumor	Binds to the ATP site of Abl protein kinase, inhibiting kinase activity, preventing proliferation and inducing apoptosis in Bcr-Abl-positive cells.	Urinary retention; Gastrointestinal tract reactions; Muscle pain and fatigue; Circulatory system toxicity; Liver toxicity; Hypertension
Gefitinib (Iressa)	Second-line treatment for advanced or metastatic non-small-cell lung cancer	Binds to the intracellular kinase domain, blocking EGFR (epidermal growth factor receptor tyrosine kinase) activity and downstream signaling pathways.	Gastrointestinal tract reactions; Papules and pruritus (itching) and other skin symptoms; Hypertension
Erlotinib (Tarceva)	Second-line treatment for advanced or metastatic non-small-cell lung cancer	Binds to the intracellular kinase domain, blocking EGFR (epidermal growth factor receptor tyrosine kinase) activity and downstream signaling pathways.	Gastrointestinal tract reactions; Papules and pruritus (itching) and other skin symptoms; Hypertension
Icotinib	Second-line treatment for advanced or metastatic non-small-cell lung cancer	Binds to the intracellular kinase domain, blocking EGFR (epidermal growth factor receptor tyrosine kinase) activity and downstream signaling pathways.	Gastrointestinal tract reactions; Papules and pruritus (itching) and other skin symptoms; Hypertension
Afatinib	Second-line treatment for advanced or metastatic non-small-cell lung cancer	Binds to the intracellular kinase domain, blocking EGFR (epidermal growth factor receptor tyrosine kinase) activity and downstream signaling pathways.	Gastrointestinal tract reactions; Papules and pruritus (itching) and other skin symptoms; Hypertension
Temsirolimus (Torisel)	Advanced kidney cancer	Blocks the PI3K-Akt-mTOR signaling pathway and other mTOR-mediated signal transduction processes.	Occasional adverse reactions
Everolimus (Afinitor)	Advanced kidney cancer	Blocks the PI3K-Akt-mTOR signaling pathway and other mTOR-mediated signal transduction processes.	Occasional adverse reactions
Vemurafenib	Unresectable or metastatic melanoma with BRAF V600E mutation	Blocks B-Raf kinase	Occasional adverse reactions
Dabrafenib	Unresectable or metastatic melanoma with BRAF V600E mutation	Blocks B-Raf kinase	Occasional adverse reactions
Ibrutinib	Mantle cell lymphoma, chronic lymphocytic leukemia, macroglobulinemia	Blocks BTK protein tyrosine kinase	Occasional adverse reactions
Idelalisib	Refractory acute lymphoblastic leukemia, refractory follicular B-cell non-Hodgkin lymphoma, refractory small lymphocytic lymphoma	Blocks PI3Kδ lipid kinase	Occasional adverse reactions
Osimertinib	Non-small-cell lung cancer	Inhibits EGFR protein tyrosine kinase	Occasional adverse reactions
2. Multi-target kinase inhibitors
Sorafenib (Nexavar)	Kidney cancer, liver cancer, etc.	Blocks the Ras/Raf/MEK/ERK signaling pathway while inhibiting VEGFR (vascular endothelial growth factor receptor) and PDGFR (platelet-derived growth factor receptor) tyrosine kinase activity.	Fatigue; Gastrointestinal tract reactions; Rash; Hair loss
Sunitinib (Sutent)	Advanced kidney cancer, gastrointestinal stromal tumor, advanced pancreatic cancer	Blocks the ATP-binding sites of VEGFR1/2/3 and PDGFR intracellular tyrosine kinase domains, while inhibiting c-kit (stem cell factor receptor), RET (glial cell-derived neurotrophic factor receptor), CSF-1R (colony-stimulating factor receptor-1), and other protein tyrosine kinases.	Fatigue; Gastrointestinal tract reactions; Rash; Hair loss
Pazopanib (Votrient)	Advanced kidney cancer, advanced soft-tissue sarcoma	Inhibits VEGFR-1/2/3, PDGFR-α/β, and c-kit protein tyrosine kinases	Hypertension; Gastrointestinal tract reactions; Hair depigmentation
Vandetanib (Zactima)	Advanced or metastatic medullary thyroid cancer	Inhibits VEGFR, EGFR, and RET protein tyrosine kinases	Gastrointestinal tract reactions; Rash; Hypertension; Upper respiratory tract infection
Lapatinib (Tykerb)	Advanced or metastatic breast cancer	Inhibits ErbB1/EGFR and ErbB2/HER2 protein tyrosine kinases	Gastrointestinal tract reactions; Rash; Respiratory difficulty; Insomnia
Crizotinib	ALK-positive metastatic non-small-cell lung cancer	Inhibits ALK, C-MET, and HGFR protein tyrosine kinases	Gastrointestinal tract reactions; Rash
Ruxolitinib	Moderate or high-risk primary myelofibrosis	Inhibits JAK1 and JAK2 protein tyrosine kinases	Gastrointestinal tract reactions
Axitinib	Primary myelofibrosis, polycythemia vera	Inhibits VEGFR, C-KIT, PDGFR, and other protein tyrosine kinases	Gastrointestinal tract reactions; Rash; Hypertension; Upper respiratory tract infection
Regorafenib	Metastatic colorectal cancer, advanced gastrointestinal stromal tumor	Inhibits VEGFR and other protein tyrosine kinases	Gastrointestinal tract reactions; Rash
Cabozantinib	Progressive or metastatic medullary thyroid cancer	Inhibits VEGFR and C-MET protein tyrosine kinases	Gastrointestinal tract reactions; Rash
Trametinib	Unresectable or metastatic melanoma with BRAF V600E mutation	Inhibits MEK1 and MEK2 serine/threonine kinases	Occasional adverse reactions
Ceritinib	ALK-positive metastatic non-small-cell lung cancer	Inhibits ALK and other protein tyrosine kinases	Gastrointestinal tract reactions; Rash; Hypertension
Palbociclib	Advanced breast cancer in postmenopausal women with ER-positive and HER2-negative status	Inhibits CDK4 and CDK6 serine/threonine kinases	Occasional adverse reactions
Lenvatinib	Locally recurrent or metastatic, progressive, and radio-resistant differentiated thyroid tumor, liver cancer	Inhibits VEGFR, PDGFR, and other protein tyrosine kinases	Gastrointestinal tract reactions; Rash; Hypertension
V. Other antineoplastic drugs
1. Proteasome inhibitors
Bortezomib (Velcade)	Multiple myeloma	Inhibits chymotrypsin and trypsin of the proteasome 26S subunit	Fatigue; Gastrointestinal tract reactions; Thrombocytopenia
Carfilzomib	Multiple myeloma	Inhibits chymotrypsin and trypsin of the proteasome 26S subunit	Fatigue; Gastrointestinal tract reactions; Thrombocytopenia
2. Histone deacetylase inhibitors
Vorinostat (SAHA)	Cutaneous T-cell lymphoma	Inhibits histone deacetylase (HDAC)-1/2/3/6	Occasional adverse reactions
3. Monoclonal antibody drugs
Rituximab (Rituxan)	Non-Hodgkin lymphoma	Binds to CD20 antigen, causing B lymphocyte lysis	Fever; Infection; Chills; Gastrointestinal tract reactions
Alemtuzumab (Campath)	Chronic lymphocytic leukemia	Binds to CD52 antigen, causing apoptosis of CD52-positive target cells	Fever; Infection; Chills; Gastrointestinal tract reactions
Ibritumomab (Zevalin)	Relapsed or refractory non-Hodgkin lymphoma	Carries the radioactive isotope ^{90}Y, binding to CD20 antigen, concentrating ^{90}Y at tumor sites and killing tumor cells within a 5mm range via beta radiation	Blood cell reduction; Gastrointestinal tract reactions; Hypotension; Fatigue
Tositumomab (Bexxar)	Non-Hodgkin lymphoma	Carries the radioactive isotope ^{131}I, binding to CD20 antigen, killing tumor cells via ^{131}I radioactivity	Blood cell reduction; Gastrointestinal tract reactions; Hypotension; Fatigue
Trastuzumab (Herceptin)	Metastatic breast cancer with high HER-2 (epidermal growth factor receptor) expression	Selectively binds to HER-2 (ErbB-2), blocking HER-2-mediated PI3K and MAPK signaling pathways, inhibiting proliferation of HER-2-overexpressed tumor cells	Headache; Chills; Gastrointestinal tract reactions
Cetuximab (Erbitux)	Metastatic colorectal cancer, head and neck tumors	Inhibits tumor proliferation mediated by EGFR signaling pathways	Headache; Chills; Gastrointestinal tract reactions
Panitumumab (Vectibix)	Metastatic colorectal cancer	Inhibits tumor proliferation mediated by EGFR signaling pathways	Headache; Chills; Gastrointestinal tract reactions
Nimotuzumab	Stage III/IV nasopharyngeal carcinoma with HER-1-positive expression	Inhibits tumor proliferation mediated by EGFR signaling pathways	Headache; Chills; Gastrointestinal tract reactions
Pertuzumab (Perjeta)	Breast cancer with HER-2-positive expression	Inhibits tumor proliferation mediated by EGFR signaling pathways	Headache; Chills; Gastrointestinal tract reactions
Bevacizumab (Avastin)	Metastatic colorectal cancer, advanced non-small cell lung cancer, metastatic kidney cancer, malignant glioma	Binds to VEGF (vascular endothelial growth factor), preventing VEGF from binding to its receptors (KDR and Flt-1) on tumor vascular endothelial cells, inhibiting tumor angiogenesis	Hypertension; Risk of stroke and myocardial infarction; Proteinuria; Gastrointestinal perforation; Impaired wound healing
Ipilimumab (Yervoy)	Melanoma, lung cancer	Inhibits CTLA4	Occasional adverse reactions
Pembrolizumab (Keytruda)	Melanoma, non-small-cell lung cancer	Inhibits PD1	Occasional adverse reactions
4. Drugs regulating hormone balance (Note: Strictly speaking, these drugs belong to endocrine therapy drugs (ATC code L02), but due to their widespread use in cancer treatment, they are listed here.)
Diethylstilbestrol	Menopausal breast cancer	Regulates hormone balance, inhibiting certain hormone-dependent cancers, serving as adjuvant therapy	(See Genitourinary system and sex steroids, Endocrine therapy, Glucocorticoid, Corticosteroid, etc.)
Methyltestosterone	Advanced breast cancer with bone metastasis	Regulates hormone balance, inhibiting certain hormone-dependent cancers, serving as adjuvant therapy	(See Genitourinary system and sex steroids, Endocrine therapy, Glucocorticoid, Corticosteroid, etc.)
Testosterone Propionate	Advanced breast cancer with bone metastasis	Regulates hormone balance, inhibiting certain hormone-dependent cancers, serving as adjuvant therapy	(See Genitourinary system and sex steroids, Endocrine therapy, Glucocorticoid, Corticosteroid, etc.)
Fluoxymesterone	Advanced breast cancer with bone metastasis	Regulates hormone balance, inhibiting certain hormone-dependent cancers, serving as adjuvant therapy	(See Genitourinary system and sex steroids, Endocrine therapy, Glucocorticoid, Corticosteroid, etc.)
Medroxyprogesterone (MPA)	Breast cancer, kidney cancer, endometrial cancer	Regulates hormone balance, inhibiting certain hormone-dependent cancers, serving as adjuvant therapy	(See Genitourinary system and sex steroids, Endocrine therapy, Glucocorticoid, Corticosteroid, etc.)
Prednisone	Adjuvant therapy for Hodgkin lymphoma and lymphoma	Regulates hormone balance, inhibiting certain hormone-dependent cancers, serving as adjuvant therapy	(See Genitourinary system and sex steroids, Endocrine therapy, Glucocorticoid, Corticosteroid, etc.)
Tamoxifen (TAM)	Breast cancer	Regulates hormone balance, inhibiting certain hormone-dependent cancers, serving as adjuvant therapy	(See Genitourinary system and sex steroids, Endocrine therapy, Glucocorticoid, Corticosteroid, etc.)
Goserelin	Prostate cancer, menopausal breast cancer	Regulates hormone balance, inhibiting certain hormone-dependent cancers, serving as adjuvant therapy	(See Genitourinary system and sex steroids, Endocrine therapy, Glucocorticoid, Corticosteroid, etc.)
Leuprorelin	Pre-menopausal and estrogen receptor-positive prostate cancer and breast cancer	Regulates hormone balance, inhibiting certain hormone-dependent cancers, serving as adjuvant therapy	(See Genitourinary system and sex steroids, Endocrine therapy, Glucocorticoid, Corticosteroid, etc.)
Flutamide	Prostate cancer	Regulates hormone balance, inhibiting certain hormone-dependent cancers, serving as adjuvant therapy	(See Genitourinary system and sex steroids, Endocrine therapy, Glucocorticoid, Corticosteroid, etc.)
Toremifene	Menopausal estrogen receptor-positive metastatic breast cancer	Regulates hormone balance, inhibiting certain hormone-dependent cancers, serving as adjuvant therapy	(See Genitourinary system and sex steroids, Endocrine therapy, Glucocorticoid, Corticosteroid, etc.)
Letrozole	Postmenopausal advanced breast cancer	Regulates hormone balance, inhibiting certain hormone-dependent cancers, serving as adjuvant therapy	(See Genitourinary system and sex steroids, Endocrine therapy, Glucocorticoid, Corticosteroid, etc.)
Anastrozole	Adjuvant therapy for postmenopausal breast cancer	Regulates hormone balance, inhibiting certain hormone-dependent cancers, serving as adjuvant therapy	(See Genitourinary system and sex steroids, Endocrine therapy, Glucocorticoid, Corticosteroid, etc.)
Aminoglutethimide (AG)	Postmenopausal advanced breast cancer	Regulates hormone balance, inhibiting certain hormone-dependent cancers, serving as adjuvant therapy	(See Genitourinary system and sex steroids, Endocrine therapy, Glucocorticoid, Corticosteroid, etc.)
5. Drugs with other antineoplastic mechanisms
Endostar (Rh-Endostatin)	Adjuvant therapy for non-small-cell lung cancer	Inhibits proliferation and migration of tumor vascular endothelial cells, thereby suppressing tumor angiogenesis	Heart toxicity; Digestive system toxicity
Retinoic Acid (Tretinoin)	Acute promyelocytic leukemia	Modulates and degrades the PML-RARα fusion protein’s retinoic acid receptor (RARα) domain, inducing leukocyte differentiation and apoptosis	Infertility and teratogenicity
Arsenious Acid (As_{2}O_{3})	Acute promyelocytic leukemia	Modulates and degrades the PML-RARα fusion protein, downregulates bcl-2 gene expression, inducing leukocyte differentiation and apoptosis	Requires strict dose control, high doses are carcinogenic
Ubenimex	Combination therapy with chemotherapy or radiotherapy, elderly immune deficiency, etc.	Competitively inhibits aminopeptidase B and leucine peptidase activity, enhancing T lymphocyte function and NK cell activity. It also promotes colony-stimulating factor synthesis, stimulating bone marrow cell regeneration and differentiation, and interferes with tumor cell metabolism, inhibiting proliferation.	Digestive system toxicity; Rash; Transient mild transaminase elevation
Norcantharidin	Adjuvant chemotherapy for liver cancer, esophageal cancer, stomach cancer, cirrhosis	Inhibits cancer cell protein synthesis, affecting DNA and RNA synthesis, reduces cancer hormone levels (mainly cyclic guanosine monophosphate-phosphodiesterase), and increases spleen lymphocyte production of interleukin II and macrophage production of interleukin I, enhancing immunity	Digestive system toxicity; Injectable forms may cause skin reactions
Cucurbitacin B	Adjuvant therapy for primary liver cancer	Exhibits multiple biological activities, including liver protection, inhibits STAT3 transcription factor activation, and disrupts the actin cytoskeleton of tumor cells	Gastrointestinal reactions
EGb761	Adjuvant therapy for metastatic cancers	Contains over 100 chemical components, with flavonoids and terpene lactones as active ingredients with antitumor activity	Interactions with anticoagulants

== Mechanism of action ==
Cytotoxic drugs disrupt tumor cells by affecting one or more phases of the cell cycle but lack specificity, resulting in significant toxicity.

Tumor cell populations include proliferating cells, quiescent cells (G_{0} phase), and non-proliferative cells. The ratio of proliferating tumor cells to the total tumor cell population is called the growth fraction (GF). The time from the end of one cell division to the end of the next is called the cell cycle, which consists of four phases: pre-DNA synthesis (G_{1} phase), DNA synthesis (S phase), post-DNA synthesis (G_{2} phase), and mitosis (M phase).

=== Cytotoxic drugs ===
Cytotoxic drugs exert cytotoxic effects on tumor cells in different phases of the cell cycle and delay phase transitions by affecting biochemical events. Based on their sensitivity to tumor cells in specific phases, cytotoxic drugs are broadly divided into two categories:

1. Cell cycle non-specific agents (CCNSA): These drugs kill cells in various phases of the proliferative cycle, including G_{0} phase cells, such as drugs that directly damage DNA structure or affect its replication or transcription functions (e.g., alkylating agents, antitumor antibiotics, and platinum complexes). These drugs often have a strong effect on malignant tumor cells, rapidly killing them in a dose-dependent manner, with effects increasing exponentially within the body’s tolerable toxicity limits.
2. Cell cycle (phase) specific agents (CCSA): These drugs are sensitive only to specific phases of the proliferative cycle and not to G_{0} phase cells, such as antimetabolites acting on S-phase cells and vinblastine drugs acting on M-phase cells. These drugs have a weaker effect on tumor cells, with time-dependent cytotoxicity, requiring a certain duration to take effect, and their efficacy does not increase beyond a certain dose.

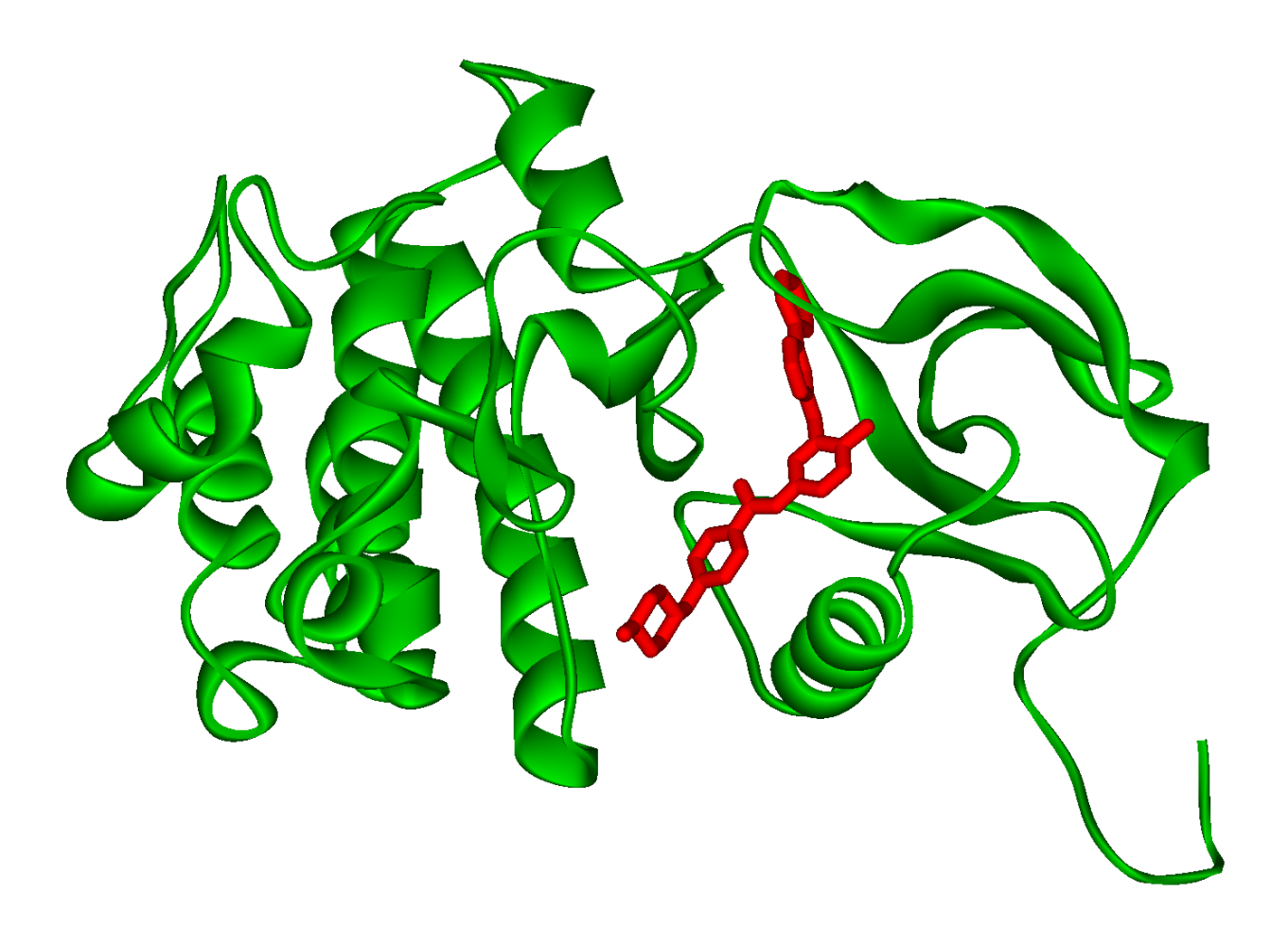
Bcr-Abl kinase is one of the targets of protein tyrosine kinase inhibitors and was the first specific target identified.

=== Non-cytotoxic drugs ===
Non-cytotoxic drugs primarily target key regulatory molecules in tumor molecular pathology processes. Examples include hormones or their antagonists that alter hormone imbalance; protein tyrosine kinase inhibitors, farnesyltransferase inhibitors, MAPK signaling pathway inhibitors, and cell cycle regulators targeting cell signal transduction molecules; monoclonal antibodies targeting proliferation-related cell signal transduction receptors; angiogenesis inhibitors that disrupt or inhibit new blood vessel formation, effectively preventing tumor growth and metastasis; anti-metastatic drugs that reduce cancer cell shedding, adhesion, and basement membrane degradation; and inhibitors targeting telomerase to promote differentiation of malignant tumor cells.

== Toxicology ==
Currently, clinically used cytotoxic drugs lack ideal selectivity for tumor cells versus normal cells, meaning that while killing malignant tumor cells, they also cause some degree of damage to normal tissues. Toxic reactions are a key factor limiting the dosage used in chemotherapy and also affect patients’ quality of life. Some molecularly targeted drugs in non-cytotoxic drugs, such as tumor signaling pathway inhibitors, can specifically target certain molecular sites in tumor cells that are typically not expressed or minimally expressed in normal cells. Therefore, non-cytotoxic drugs generally have high safety, good tolerability, and milder toxic reactions.

=== Adverse reactions of cytotoxic drugs ===
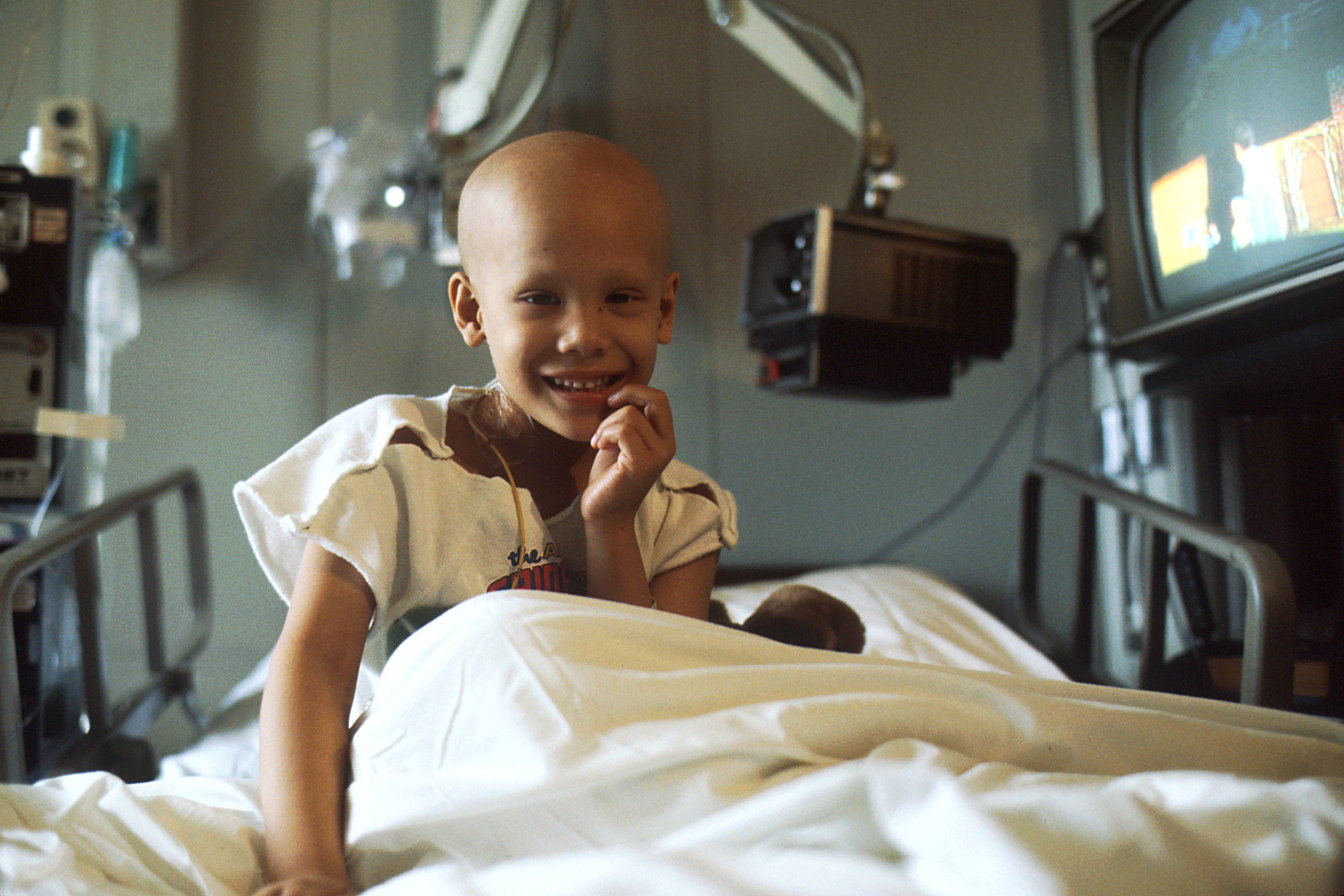
Hair loss is one of the most visible side effects of cytotoxic drugs.

==== Common toxic reactions ====
- Bone marrow suppression: One of the major obstacles in cancer chemotherapy, most cytotoxic drugs, except hormones, bleomycin, and L-asparaginase, cause varying degrees of bone marrow suppression. The likelihood of reduced peripheral blood cell counts after chemotherapy depends on cell lifespan, with shorter-lived peripheral blood cells more likely to decrease, typically starting with leukopenia followed by thrombocytopenia, generally without causing severe anemia. In addition to using colony-stimulating factors such as GM-CSF, G-CSF, M-CSF, and EPO to manage blood cell decline, nursing care must include measures to prevent infections and control bleeding.
- Gastrointestinal reactions: The most common toxic reaction of cytotoxic drugs. Chemotherapy-induced nausea and vomiting are classified into acute (within 24 hours of chemotherapy) and delayed (after 24 hours). For high or moderate emetogenic drugs, dexamethasone and 5-HT_{3} receptor antagonists (e.g., ondansetron) may be used, while mild emetogenic drugs can be managed with metoclopramide or chlorpromazine. Chemotherapy can also damage rapidly proliferating gastrointestinal mucosal tissues, easily causing stomatitis, oral ulcers, glossitis, and esophagitis, necessitating attention to oral hygiene to prevent infections.
- Hair loss: Normal human scalp has about 100,000 hairs, with 10%–15% of hair-generating cells in the resting phase, while the majority are actively growing, making most cytotoxic drugs capable of causing varying degrees of hair loss. During chemotherapy, using an ice cap to cool the scalp, causing local vasoconstriction, or applying a tourniquet at the hairline can reduce drug delivery to hair follicles, mitigating hair loss. Hair can regrow after chemotherapy cessation.

==== Specific toxic reactions ====
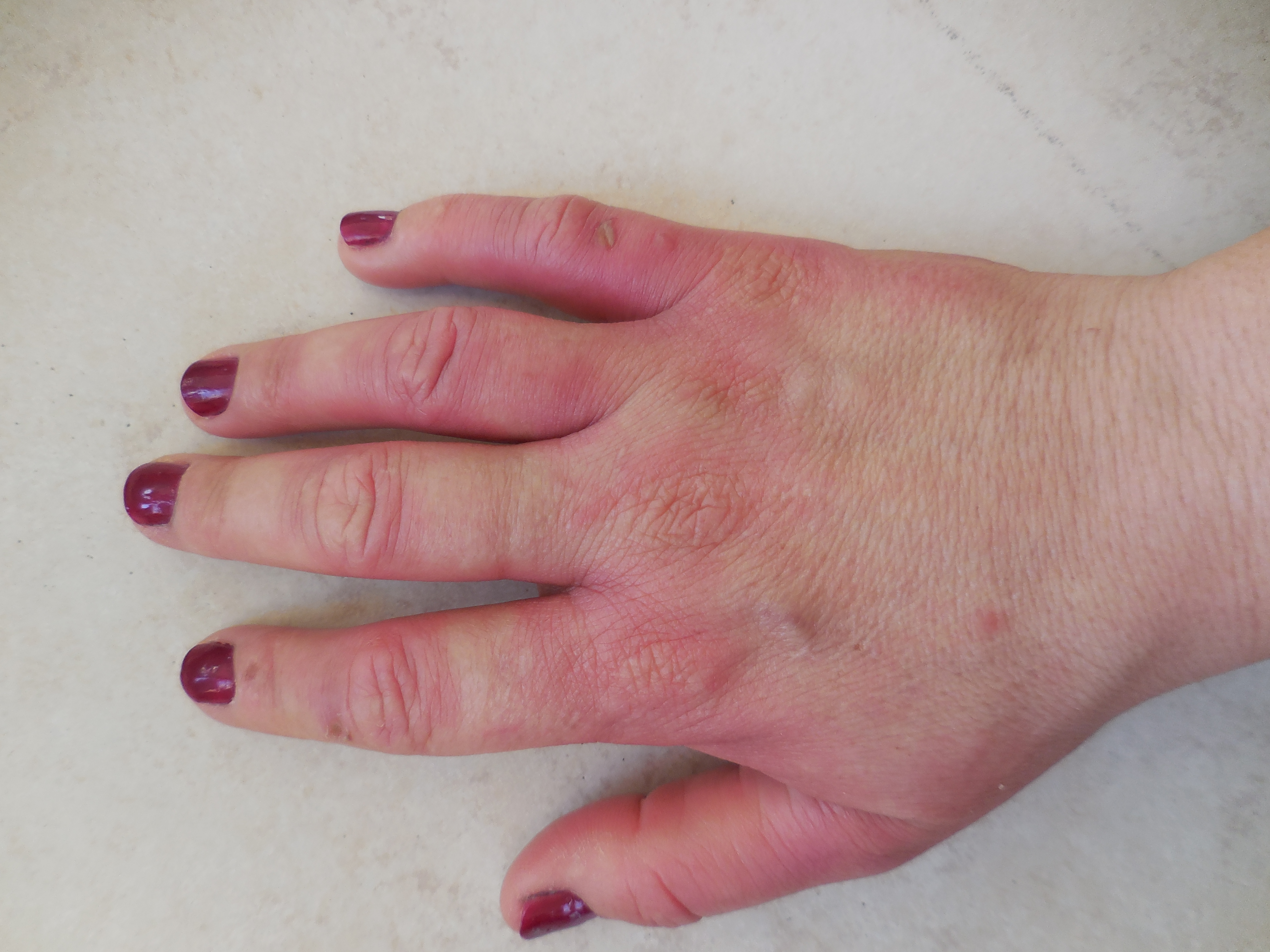
Hypersensitivity reaction is a side effect of paclitaxel; shown is a skin allergic reaction in a patient after three days of 100 mg/m^{2} dosing.

- Cardiac toxicity: Most common with doxorubicin, which can cause myocardial degeneration and interstitial edema. Cardiac toxicity may be related to doxorubicin-induced free radical generation.
- Respiratory system toxicity: Primarily manifests as interstitial pneumonia and pulmonary fibrosis, with key drugs including bleomycin, carmustine, mitomycin C, methotrexate, and gefitinib. Long-term high-dose bleomycin use can cause interstitial pneumonia and pulmonary fibrosis, possibly due to the lack of bleomycin-inactivating enzymes in lung endothelial cells.
- Liver toxicity: Some cytotoxic drugs, such as L-asparaginase, dactinomycin, and cyclophosphamide, can cause liver damage.
- Urinary system toxicity: High-dose cyclophosphamide can cause hemorrhagic cystitis, possibly due to large amounts of the metabolite acrolein excreted through the urinary tract; co-administration of mesna can prevent this. Cisplatin, secreted by renal tubules, can damage proximal and distal tubules. Maintaining adequate urine output can help reduce urinary system toxicity.
- Neurotoxicity: Vincristine is most likely to cause peripheral neuropathy. Cisplatin, methotrexate, and 5-fluorouracil may occasionally cause some neurotoxicity.
- Hypersensitivity reaction: Antineoplastic drugs that are polypeptides or proteins, such as L-asparaginase and bleomycin, are likely to cause hypersensitivity reactions when administered intravenously. Paclitaxel’s hypersensitivity reactions may be related to the excipient polyoxyethylated castor oil.
- Tissue necrosis and deep vein thrombosis: Highly irritating drugs, such as mitomycin C and doxorubicin, can cause thrombophlebitis at the injection site, and extravasation of the injection solution can lead to local tissue necrosis, necessitating proper injection techniques.

==== Long-term toxic reactions ====
- Second primary malignant tumors: Many antineoplastic drugs, particularly alkylating agents, are mutagenic and carcinogenic, and have immunosuppressive effects. In patients who achieve long-term survival after chemotherapy, some may develop second primary malignant tumors potentially related to chemotherapy.
- Infertility and teratogenicity: Many antineoplastic drugs, especially alkylating agents, can affect germ cell production and endocrine function, causing infertility and teratogenic effects. In male patients, testicular germ cell numbers significantly decrease, leading to male infertility; in female patients, permanent ovarian dysfunction and amenorrhea may occur, and in pregnant women, miscarriage or teratogenesis may result.

=== Adverse reactions of non-cytotoxic drugs ===
Non-cytotoxic drugs have milder toxic reactions but still exhibit some side effects.

==== Monoclonal antibody drugs ====
Monoclonal antibody drugs are classified into murine monoclonal antibodies, chimeric monoclonal antibodies, humanized monoclonal antibodies, and fully humanized monoclonal antibodies. Murine monoclonal antibodies (drugs with “-momab” as the generic name suffix) have good specificity and rapid metabolism but, due to their lack of humanized components, induce human anti-mouse antibodies, resulting in significant side effects. Due to these significant side effects, no new murine monoclonal antibody drugs have entered clinical research since 2003. Chimeric monoclonal antibodies (drugs with “-ximab” as the generic name suffix) are composed of the variable (V) region of murine monoclonal antibodies spliced with the constant (C) region of human antibodies, with human components accounting for 60%–70%, reducing side effects while retaining antigen-binding specificity. Humanized monoclonal antibodies (drugs with “-zumab” or “-umab” as the generic name suffix) replace the CDR of human antibodies with that of murine monoclonal antibodies, with human components accounting for about 90%, further reducing side effects but slightly decreasing antigen-binding capacity. Fully humanized monoclonal antibodies (drugs with “-mumab” or “-umab” as the generic name suffix) are produced by gene knockout technology, replacing mouse antibody genes with human antibody genes, followed by immunization with antigens and hybridoma techniques. With 100% human components, they have minimal side effects and unaffected therapeutic efficacy.

==== Small-molecule kinase inhibitors ====
Due to their high specificity, small-molecule kinase inhibitors have minimal side effects, with gastrointestinal reactions being the most common. Inhibitors targeting epidermal growth factor receptor (EGFR) and vascular endothelial growth factor receptor (VEGFR), such as gefitinib, can affect the patient’s circulatory system, leading to hypertension and high blood sugar side effects.

== Drug resistance ==
Tumor cells developing resistance to antineoplastic drugs is a major cause of chemotherapy failure. Some tumor cells exhibit natural resistance, where they are inherently insensitive to certain drugs, such as G_{0} phase tumor cells, which are generally insensitive to most antineoplastic drugs. Other tumor cells develop acquired resistance, becoming insensitive to drugs they were initially sensitive to after a period of treatment. The most prominent and common form of resistance is multiple drug resistance (MDR) or pleiotropic drug resistance, where tumor cells develop resistance to multiple structurally and mechanistically diverse antineoplastic drugs after exposure to one drug. The mechanisms of drug resistance are complex, varying by drug and involving multiple resistance mechanisms for the same drug. The genetic basis of resistance has been established, with tumor cells having a fixed mutation rate during proliferation, each mutation potentially leading to resistant tumor strains. Thus, the larger the tumor (i.e., the more divisions), the greater the chance of resistant strains emerging. The tumor stem cell hypothesis suggests that tumor stem cells are a primary cause of chemotherapy failure, with drug resistance being one of their characteristics. Modern research indicates that tumor cells are more likely to develop resistance to molecularly targeted drugs.

== Pharmaceutics ==
Liposomes, composed of phospholipids and other small molecules, are commonly used as targeted drug carriers.

Due to the lack of selectivity of cytotoxic drugs, they cause significant side effects. In addition to developing new non-cytotoxic drugs to reduce side effects, modifying the dosage forms of cytotoxic drugs is an important strategy. In 1906, Paul Ehrlich proposed the concept of targeted drug systems. Targeted formulations, considered the fourth generation of drug dosage forms, are deemed suitable for antineoplastic drugs. These formulations enhance the specificity of non-cytotoxic drugs and confer selectivity to cytotoxic drugs.

Early targeted formulations were primarily passive. In 1961, British hematologist Alec Bangham invented liposomes. In 1971, liposomes were first used as drug carriers, marking the earliest passive targeted formulation. Liposomes enable drugs to selectively kill or inhibit cancer cell proliferation, increasing selectivity for lymphoid tissues. Since tumor cells contain higher concentrations of phosphatases and acylases than normal cells, encapsulating anticancer drugs in liposomes facilitates drug release due to enzymatic action and enhances drug retention in target areas. Active targeted formulations include modified drug carriers (e.g., ibuprofen zinc microemulsion), prodrugs (e.g., cyclophosphamide), and drug-macromolecule complexes. Due to their higher selectivity, active targeted formulations deliver drugs directly to the target area, enhancing therapeutic efficacy.

With advances in molecular biology, research on physicochemical targeted formulations has deepened. These include magnetic targeted formulations, embolism targeted formulations, thermosensitive targeted formulations, and pH-sensitive targeted formulations. Magnetic targeted formulations encapsulate drugs with ferromagnetic materials in polymeric carriers, guided by external magnetic fields for targeted delivery and localization in the body, primarily used as anticancer drug carriers. Embolism targeted formulations block blood supply and nutrients to the target area, causing ischemic necrosis of cancer cells. Embolism formulations containing antineoplastic drugs combine embolization with targeted chemotherapy. pH-sensitive formulations exploit the significantly lower pH of tumor interstitial fluid compared to surrounding normal tissues for targeted therapy.

== Preparation methods ==
Most antineoplastic drugs are industrially prepared through total or semi-synthesis, while a few drugs (e.g., polypeptide or protein-based antineoplastic drugs) are produced on a large scale through biopharmaceutical methods or natural component extraction.

== Future development ==
Molecular targeted antineoplastic drugs, such as imatinib, are a key focus in new drug development.

With a deeper understanding of tumor pathogenesis and the regulation of cell differentiation, proliferation, and apoptosis at the molecular level, antineoplastic drugs have shifted from traditional cytotoxic effects to targeting multiple molecular pathways. Newly marketed molecular targeted antineoplastic drugs can be divided into small molecule chemical drugs and biotechnology drugs. The former primarily consist of various small molecule kinase inhibitors, alongside proteasome inhibitors and some epigenetic drugs. The latter, represented by monoclonal antibody drugs, are increasingly becoming a cornerstone of cancer therapy. These drugs surpass traditional direct cytotoxic agents. The development of molecular targeted antineoplastic drugs is currently a hot topic in drug development.

=== Target-based drug development ===
Current methods for developing targets for antineoplastic drugs include: identifying targets from effective monomeric compounds; discovering targets based on differences in gene expression between normal and pathological tissues; identifying targets through quantitative analysis and comparative studies of changes in protein expression profiles in normal versus diseased states; discovering targets based on protein interactions; and using RNA interference technology to specifically suppress the expression of different genes in cells, identifying targets through changes in cellular phenotype. The development of new antineoplastic drugs involves using the three-dimensional structure of targets, employing computer-aided drug design to rapidly screen for lead compounds, and subsequently obtaining the target drug. The primary targets for new targeted antineoplastic drugs are divided into genomics and proteomics. Currently, targeted antineoplastic drugs focus on two main types of driver genes: one is receptor molecules located on the cell membrane (e.g., HER2/neu), and the other is molecules in key intracellular signaling pathways (e.g., EGFR). Mutations such as insertions, deletions, rearrangements, or amplifications activate driver genes, conferring adaptability to cancer cells, thus driving cancer development and progression. Protein targets for targeted antineoplastic drugs mainly include disease-specific proteins (e.g., polypeptide Op18, heat shock protein 70), biomarker molecules (e.g., cellular keratin CK19), and enzyme molecules (e.g., histone deacetylase (HDAC)).

== See also ==
- List of antineoplastic agents
- Cancer
- Neoplasm
- Leukemia
- Cancer stem cell
- Drug development
