= Streptomyces verticillus =

Scientific classification
- Domain: Bacteria
- Kingdom: Bacillati
- Phylum: Actinomycetota
- Class: Actinomycetes
- Order: Streptomycetales
- Family: Streptomycetaceae
- Genus: Streptomyces
- Species: S. verticillus

Binomial name
- Streptomyces verticillus

Species of bacterium

Streptomyces verticillus is a species of Gram-positive bacteria in the genus Streptomyces. Whilst screening fermentation broths of this species for bioactivity in the early 1960s, Hamao Umezawa and colleagues at the Institute of Microbial Chemistry in Tokyo identified a family of glycopeptide antitumor antibiotics called the bleomycins. Examples of the bleomycins in clinical use include bleomycin A_{2} (also known as bleomycin) and bleomycin A_{5} (also known as pingyangmycin). Both are used to treat lymphomas (e.g. Hodgkin's lymphoma), head and neck cancer, and testicular cancer.

== See also ==
- List of Streptomyces species
