= Pixantrone =

Chemical compound

Names
- Preferred IUPAC name 6,9-Bis[(2-aminoethyl)amino]benzo[g]isoquinoline-5,10-dione

Identifiers
CAS Number	144510-96-3
3D model (JSmol)	Interactive image
ChEBI	CHEBI:135945
ChEMBL	ChEMBL167731
ChemSpider	118174
DrugBank	DB06193
IUPHAR/BPS	7544
KEGG	D05522
PubChem CID	134019
UNII	F5SXN2KNMR
CompTox Dashboard (EPA)	DTXSID10162744
- InChI: InChI=1S/C17H19N5O2/c18-4-7-21-12-1-2-13(22-8-5-19)15-14(12)16(23)10-3-6-20-9-11(10)17(15)24/h1-3,6,9,21-22H,4-5,7-8,18-19H2 Key: PEZPMAYDXJQYRV-UHFFFAOYSA-N; InChI=1/C17H19N5O2/c18-4-7-21-12-1-2-13(22-8-5-19)15-14(12)16(23)10-3-6-20-9-11(10)17(15)24/h1-3,6,9,21-22H,4-5,7-8,18-19H2 Key: PEZPMAYDXJQYRV-UHFFFAOYAV
- SMILES: O=C2c3c(C(=O)c1c(ccc(NCCN)c12)NCCN)cncc3

Properties
Chemical formula	C_{17}H_{19}N_{5}O_{2}
Molar mass	325.365 g/mol
Appearance	Blue solid

Pharmacology
ATC code	L01DB11 (WHO)
Routes of administration	Intravenous
- Pharmacokinetics
Biological half-life	9.5–17.5 hours
Excretion	Fecal (main route of excretion) and renal (4–9%)
Legal status	UK: POM (Prescription only) / Discontinued; EU: Rx-only / Expired
- Except where otherwise noted, data are given for materials in their standard state (at 25 °C [77 °F], 100 kPa). verify (what is ?) Infobox references

Pixantrone (rINN; trade name Pixuvri) is an experimental antineoplastic (anti-cancer) drug, an analogue of mitoxantrone with fewer toxic effects on cardiac tissue. It acts as a topoisomerase II poison and intercalating agent. The code name BBR 2778 refers to pixantrone dimaleate, the actual substance commonly used in clinical trials.

== History ==
Anthracyclines are important chemotherapy agents. However, their use is associated with irreversible and cumulative heart damage. Investigators have attempted to design related drugs that maintain the biological activity, but do not possess the cardiotoxicity of the anthracyclines. Pixantrone was developed to reduce heart damage related to treatment while retaining efficacy.

Random screening at the US National Cancer Institute of a vast number of compounds provided by the Allied Chemical Company led to the discovery of ametantrone as having significant anti-tumor activity. Further investigation regarding the rational development of analogs of ametantrone led to the synthesis of mitoxantrone, which also exhibited marked anti-tumor activity Mitoxantrone was considered as an analog of doxorubicin with less structural complexity but with a similar mode of action. In clinical studies, mitoxantrone was shown to be effective against numerous types of tumors with less toxic side effects than those resulting from doxorubicin therapy. However, mitoxantrone was not totally free of cardiotoxicity. A number of structurally modified analogs of mitoxantrone were synthesized and structure-activity relationship studies made. BBR 2778 was originally synthesized by University of Vermont researchers Miles P. Hacker and Paul A. Krapcho and initially characterized in vitro for tumor cell cytotoxicity and mechanism of action by studies at the Boehringer Mannheim Italia Research Center, Monza, and University of Vermont, Burlington. Other studies have been completed at the University of Texas M. D. Anderson Cancer Center, Houston, the Istituto Nazionale Tumori, Milan, and the University of Padua. In the search for novel heteroanalogs of anthracenediones, it was selected as the most promising compound. Toxicological studies indicated that BBR 2778 was not cardiotoxic, and US patents are held by the University of Vermont. An additional US patent application was completed in June 1995 by Boehringer Mannheim, Italy.

Novuspharma, an Italian company, was established in 1998 following the merger of Boehringer Mannheim and Hoffmann-La Roche, and BBR 2778 was developed as Novuspharma's leading anti-cancer drug, pixantrone. A patent application for the injectable preparation was filed in May 2003.

In 2003, Cell Therapeutics, a Seattle biotechnology company, acquired pixantrone through a merger with Novuspharma.

=== Clinical trials ===
Pixantrone is a substance that is being studied in the treatment of cancer. It belongs to the family of drugs called antitumor antibiotics. phase III clinical trials of pixantrone have been completed. Pixantrone is being studied as an antineoplastic for different kinds of cancer, including solid tumors and hematological malignancies such as non-Hodgkin lymphomas.

Animal studies demonstrated that pixantrone does not worsen pre-existing heart muscle damage, suggesting that pixantrone may be useful in patients pretreated with anthracyclines. While only minimal cardiac changes are observed in mice given repeated cycles of pixantrone, 2 cycles of traditional anthracyclines doxorubicin or mitoxantrone result in marked or severe heart muscle degeneration.

Clinical trials substituting pixantrone for doxorubicin in standard first-line treatment of patients with aggressive non-Hodgkin's lymphoma, had a reduction in severe side effects when compared to patients treated with standard doxorubicin-based therapy. Despite pixantrone patients receiving more treatment cycles, a three-fold reduction in the incidence of severe heart damage was seen as well as clinically significant reductions in infections and thrombocytopenia, and a significant reduction in febrile neutropenia. These findings could have major implications for treating patients with breast cancer, lymphoma, and leukemia, where debilitating cardiac damage from doxorubicin might be prevented. Previous treatment options for multiply relapsed aggressive non-Hodgkin lymphoma had disappointing response rates.

The completed phase II RAPID trial compared the CHOP-R regimen of Cyclophosphamide, Doxorubicin, Vincristine, Prednisone, and Rituximab to the same regimen, but substituting Doxorubicin with Pixantrone. The objective was to show that Pixantrone was not inferior to Doxorubicin and less toxic to the heart.

Pixantrone was shown to have potentially reduced cardiotoxicity and demonstrated promising clinical activity in these phase II studies in heavily pretreated non-Hodgkin lymphoma patients.

The phase III EXTEND (PIX301) randomized clinical trial studied pixantrone to see how well it works compared to other chemotherapy drugs in treating participants with relapsed non-Hodgkin's lymphoma. The complete response rate in pixantrone treated with pixantrone has been significantly higher than in those receiving other chemotherapeutic agents for treatment of relapsed/refractory aggressive non-Hodgkin lymphoma.

== Administration ==
It can be administered through a peripheral vein rather than a central implanted catheter as required for other similar drugs.

== Society and culture ==
=== US Food and Drug Administration ===
The US Food and Drug Administration (FDA) granted fast track designation for pixantrone in people who had previously been treated two or more times for relapsed or refractory aggressive Non-Hodgkin's Lymphoma. Study sponsor Cell Therapeutics announced that pixantrone achieved the primary efficacy endpoint. The minutes of the Oncologic Drugs Advisory Committee meeting of 22 March 2010 show that this had not in fact been achieved with statistical significance and this combined with major safety concerns lead to the conclusion that the trial was not sufficient to support approval. In April 2010, the FDA asked for an additional trial.

=== European Medicines Agency ===
In May 2009, pixantrone became available in the European Union on a named-patient basis. A named-patient program is a compassionate use drug supply program under which physicians can legally supply investigational drugs to qualifying individuals. Under a named-patient program, investigational drugs can be administered to people who are suffering from serious illnesses prior to the drug being approved by the European Medicines Evaluation Agency. "Named-patient" distribution refers to the distribution or sale of a product to a specific healthcare professional for the treatment of an individual. In the European Union, under the named-patient program the drug is most often purchased through the national health system. In 2012, pixantrone received conditional marketing authorization in the European Union as Monotherapy to Treat Adult Patients with Multiply Relapsed or Refractory Aggressive Non-Hodgkin B-Cell Lymphomas. The authorization expired in July 2024, after the holder decided not to renew.

== Research ==
Pixantrone is as potent as mitoxantrone in animal models of multiple sclerosis. Pixantrone has a similar mechanism of action as mitoxantrone on the effector function of lymphomonocyte B and T cells in experimental allergic encephalomyelitis but with lower cardiotoxicity. Pixantrone inhibits antigen specific and mitogen induced lymphomononuclear cell proliferation, as well as IFN-gamma production. Clinical trials are currently ongoing in Europe.

Pixantrone also reduces the severity of experimental autoimmune myasthenia gravis in Lewis rats, and in vitro cell viability experiments indicated that Pixantrone significantly reduces amyloid beta (A beta(1-42)) neurotoxicity, a mechanism implicated in Alzheimer's disease.
