= Nippon Kayaku =

Japanese explosives manufacturing company

Nippon Kayaku Co., Ltd.
- Type: Public (K.K)
- Traded as: TYO: 4272; OTC Pink: NPKYY
- Industry: Chemicals, Pharmaceuticals
- Founded: Tokyo, Japan (June 5, 1916; 110 years ago)
- Headquarters: Tokyo Fujimi Bldg., 11-2, Fujimi 1-chome, Chiyoda-ku, Tokyo 102-8172, Japan
- Key people: Masanobu Suzuki (President)
- Products: Agrochemicals; Airbag inflators; Dyes; Explosives; Functional films; Pharmaceuticals; Synthetic resins
- Revenue: ▲JPY 161.8 billion (FY 2014) (US$ 1.34 billion) (FY 2014)
- Net income: ▲JPY 15.7 billion (FY 2014) (US$ 130.2 million) (FY 2014)
- Number of employees: 1,879 (non-consolidated), 5,174 (consolidated) (as of March 31, 2015)
- Website: Official website

Nippon Kayaku (日本化薬株式会社, Nihon Kayaku Kabushiki-gaisha) (Japan Pharmaceuticals) is a Japanese chemical and pharmaceutical company that was founded in 1916 as the first industrial explosives manufacturer in Japan under the company name Nippon Kayaku Seizo Co., Ltd.. Its main business areas are functional chemicals, pharmaceuticals, safety systems and agrochemicals. The company operates 8 plants and 4 laboratories in Japan. It also has subsidiaries in different countries around the world. It is listed on the Nikkei 225.

== History ==
The company was established in 1916 to produce explosives for the construction sector. The firm then diversified into chemical dyes and pharmaceuticals in the interwar period.

By 1950, Nippon Kayaku had established itself as the ninth leading pharmaceutical firm in Japan. The launch of its anticancer drug, bleomycin, strengthened the firm's pharmaceutical business.

== Products ==
Major products made by Nippon Kayaku are: epoxy resins, UV-curing type resins, functional films, photoresists, colors for inkjet printers, catalysts, dyes pharmaceuticals, pharmaceutical API and intermediates, diagnostics, airbag inflators, micro gas generators for seatbelt pretensioners, squibs, and agrochemicals. Nippon Kayaku’s Functional Chemicals segment includes electronic materials, specialty polymers, and photoresists used in industrial and semiconductor manufacturing. Its U.S. subsidiary Kayaku Advanced Materials, Inc., formerly MicroChem Corp., develops materials for MEMS, semiconductor packaging, photolithography, and related microfabrication applications, including thick-film photoresists, dielectric materials, and specialty coatings.

== North American Operations ==
Nippon Kayaku’s North American operations include specialty chemicals, advanced materials, and semiconductor-related businesses serving the electronics, industrial, and life sciences sectors. In the United States, the company operates through Kayaku Advanced Materials, Inc. (KAM), a Massachusetts-based subsidiary headquartered in Westborough. Formerly known as MicroChem Corp., the company develops and manufactures specialty polymer materials and process technologies for semiconductor, microfabrication, and advanced electronics applications.

Kayaku Advanced Materials manufactures materials for photolithography and semiconductor processing, including SU-8 epoxy-based thick-film photoresists, photo-dielectric materials for advanced semiconductor packaging, temporary and permanent photo patternable resists, and specialty polymer coating materials used in wafer-level packaging, MEMS fabrication, microfluidics, redistribution layer (RDL) processing, and related electronics manufacturing applications. Its materials include product families such as SU-8 photoresists, KMSF dielectric materials, TempKoat protective coatings, and UniLOR polymer materials. The company also operates Paratronix, which provides parylene conformal coating and deposition services for electronics, aerospace, medical device, industrial, and semiconductor-related applications.

Nippon Kayaku’s semiconductor-related operations also include Teikoku Taping System, Inc., the company’s U.S. equipment subsidiary based in Phoenix, Arizona, which supports semiconductor back-end manufacturing processes with lamination, tape removal, wafer mounting, UV irradiation, and related semiconductor packaging equipment.
