= Scratch dermatitis =

- Other names: Flagellate pigmentation from bleomycin
- Specialty: Dermatology

Scratch dermatitis is a cutaneous condition characterized by linear hyperpigmented streaks are seen on the chest and back.

== See also ==
- Bleomycin
- List of cutaneous conditions
