= Arabinopyranosyl-N-methyl-N-nitrosourea =

Chemical compound

Clinical data
- Trade names: Aranose
- Other names: Arabinopyranosyl methylnitrosourea; 3-(α-L-Arabinopyranosyl)-1-methyl-1-nitrosourea
- AHFS/Drugs.com: Monograph
- Pregnancy category: D
- Routes of administration: Intravenously
- ATC code: L01

Legal status
- Legal status: In general: ℞ (Prescription only)

Pharmacokinetic data
- Bioavailability: 100%
- Protein binding: 50%
- Metabolism: Hepatic

Identifiers
- IUPAC name: 1-Methyl-1-nitroso-3-[(2R,3R,4S,5S)-3,4,5-trihydroxyoxan-2-yl]urea
- CAS Number: 167396-23-8
- PubChem CID: 208900
- ChemSpider: 180998
- UNII: 7149VX7891
- CompTox Dashboard (EPA): DTXSID10937318

Chemical and physical data
- Formula: C_{7}H_{13}N_{3}O_{6}
- Molar mass: 235.196 g·mol^{−1}
- 3D model (JSmol): Interactive image
- SMILES: CN(C(=O)NC1C(C(C(CO1)O)O)O)N=O
- InChI: InChI=1S/C7H13N3O6/c1-10(9-15)7(14)8-6-5(13)4(12)3(11)2-16-6/h3-6,11-13H,2H2,1H3,(H,8,14)/t3-,4-,5+,6+/m0/s1; Key:BADMGRJDJPQBLS-UNTFVMJOSA-N

Arabinopyranosyl-N-methyl-N-nitrosourea, also known as Aranose (Араноза) is a cytostatic anticancer chemotherapeutic drug of an alkylating type. Chemically it is a nitrosourea derivative. It was developed in the Soviet Union in the 1970s. It was claimed by its developers that its advantages over other nitrosoureas are a relatively low hematological toxicity (compared to other nitrosoureas available at that time) and a wider therapeutic index, which allows for its outpatient administration.

== History ==
It was first synthesized in late 1970s in the Laboratory of Organic Synthesis of Soviet Cancer Research Institute (which belonged to Academy of Medical Sciences of the USSR). Its first clinical trials in USSR were conducted in the late 1980s. Those trials confirmed its potential clinical efficacy in melanoma and better relative safety & improved tolerability over other nitrosourea antineoplastic compounds available at that time. In 1996 the compound obtained a Russian Pharmacologic Committee (a Russian analog of the U.S. Food and Drug Administration (FDA) and EMA in the European Community) regulatory approval for its use in melanoma under the trade name Aranoza.

== Chemical structure ==
The compound is basically a conjugate between the well-known cytotoxic and mutagenic residue of N-nitroso-N-methylurea and the sugar L-arabinose. The L-arabinose is a well-known component of some other effective anticancer drug molecules, including cytarabine (cytosine arabinoside) and fludarabine (2-fluoro-arabinoside of the nucleoside adenosine). The presence of L-arabinoside residue in the molecule greatly improves its penetration into malignant cells and its blood–brain barrier penetration and, while maintaining or even increasing anticancer activity, reduces the toxicity for normally fast dividing cells (bone marrow cells and mucosa of the gastro-intestinal system), improving the concentration ratio "tumor / normal tissue".

== Mechanism of action ==
Alkylating DNA with DNA intra-strand adducts and, more problematic to the cell, cross-linking between strands. This, in turn, inhibits mitosis and promotes apoptosis of the cell affected.

== Types of cancer for which it is indicated ==
Melanoma of the skin and eye, together with dacarbazine and interferon-alpha in combination chemotherapy. During preclinical trials it also shown some potential promise (in combination chemotherapy with cisplatin and gemcitabine or with cisplatin and irinotecan) for experimental non-squamous cell lung cancer.

== Main side effects ==
Like many other cytotoxic drugs, it can often cause alopecia, headache, muscle pain, joint pain, nausea and vomiting, myelosuppression with leukopenia (especially neutropenia), lymphopenia, thrombocytopenia, anemia and immunosuppression. At therapeutic doses, those side effects are usually relatively milder compared with carmustine and lomustine.

== See also ==
- List of Russian drugs
