= Stromal tumor =

Human disease

Gastrointestinal stromal tumors (GISTs) form in the soft mesenchymal tissue of the gastrointestinal tract and form from the rapid growth of interstitial cells of Cajal (ICCs). GISTs are the most common type of tumor found in the gastrointestinal tract, usually located in the small intestine or stomach. Approximately 10-20 million individuals are diagnosed with this type of tumor every year (Stamatakos et al., 2009). GISTs are most common in individuals ranging in age from 40 years old to 70 years old and are rare in small children and young adults. Individuals with these tumors may experience swelling in the abdomen, pain, vomiting, nausea, appetite loss, weight loss, low blood cell counts, gastrointestinal bleeding (which can result in bloody or dark stool), weakness, and tiredness. The prognosis for these types of tumors depends heavily on the size of the tumor and the rate of mitosis, however approximately 60 percent of GISTs are diagnosed as benign. Surgery to remove the tumor is the primary treatment method, although imatinib, everolimus, and rapamycin may soon be approved as alternative treatment and management methods.
