= Ranimustine =

Chemical compound

Clinical data
- Trade names: Cymerin
- Other names: 1-(2-chloroethyl)-1-nitroso-3-([(2R,3S,4S,5R,6S)-3,4,5-trihydroxy-6-methoxyoxan-2-yl]methyl)urea
- AHFS/Drugs.com: International Drug Names
- Routes of administration: IV
- ATC code: L01AD07 (WHO)

Legal status
- Legal status: In general: ℞ (Prescription only)

Identifiers
- IUPAC name: Methyl 6-({[(2-chloroethyl)(nitroso)amino]carbonyl}amino)-6-deoxy-α-D-glucopyranoside
- CAS Number: 58994-96-0
- PubChem CID: 71741
- ChemSpider: 64785
- UNII: RYH2T97J77
- CompTox Dashboard (EPA): DTXSID501015584

Chemical and physical data
- Formula: C_{10}H_{18}ClN_{3}O_{7}
- Molar mass: 327.72 g·mol^{−1}
- 3D model (JSmol): Interactive image
- SMILES: CO[C@@H]1[C@@H]([C@H]([C@@H]([C@H](O1)CNC(=O)N(CCCl)N=O)O)O)O
- InChI: InChI=1S/C10H18ClN3O7/c1-20-9-8(17)7(16)6(15)5(21-9)4-12-10(18)14(13-19)3-2-11/h5-9,15-17H,2-4H2,1H3,(H,12,18)/t5-,6-,7+,8-,9+/m1/s1; Key:AHHFEZNOXOZZQA-ZEBDFXRSSA-N

Ranimustine (INN, marketed under the tradename Cymerin; also known as MCNU) is a nitrosourea alkylating agent approved in Japan for the treatment of chronic myelogenous leukemia and polycythemia vera.

It has never been filed for FDA evaluation in the United States, where it is not marketed.

== Synthesis ==

Ranimustine is made by reacting the primary amine of a pyranose sugar (2) with o-nitrophenyl N-(2-chloroethyl)-N-nitrosocarbamate (1) to form the nitrosourea group.
