= Enocitabine =

Chemical compound

Clinical data
- AHFS/Drugs.com: International Drug Names
- Routes of administration: IV
- ATC code: none

Legal status
- Legal status: In general: ℞ (Prescription only)

Identifiers
- IUPAC name: N-[1-[(2R,3S,4S,5R)-3,4-dihydroxy-5-(hydroxymethyl)oxolan-2-yl]-2-oxopyrimidin-4-yl]docosanamide
- CAS Number: 55726-47-1
- PubChem CID: 71734
- ChemSpider: 64778
- UNII: 9YVR68W306
- KEGG: D01633
- ChEMBL: ChEMBL2106589
- CompTox Dashboard (EPA): DTXSID6046682

Chemical and physical data
- Formula: C_{31}H_{55}N_{3}O_{6}
- Molar mass: 565.796 g·mol^{−1}
- 3D model (JSmol): Interactive image
- SMILES: O=C(N/C/1=N/C(=O)N(\C=C\1)[C@@H]2O[C@@H]([C@@H](O)[C@@H]2O)CO)CCCCCCCCCCCCCCCCCCCCC
- InChI: InChI=1S/C31H55N3O6/c1-2-3-4-5-6-7-8-9-10-11-12-13-14-15-16-17-18-19-20-21-27(36)32-26-22-23-34(31(39)33-26)30-29(38)28(37)25(24-35)40-30/h22-23,25,28-30,35,37-38H,2-21,24H2,1H3,(H,32,33,36,39)/t25-,28-,29+,30-/m1/s1; Key:SAMRUMKYXPVKPA-VFKOLLTISA-N

Enocitabine (INN, marketed under the brand name Sunrabin) is a nucleoside analog used as chemotherapy.

Sunrabin contains the emulsifier HCO-60, which can cause allergic reactions.
