= Nitrosourea =

Skeletal formula of a minor tautomer of nitrosourea
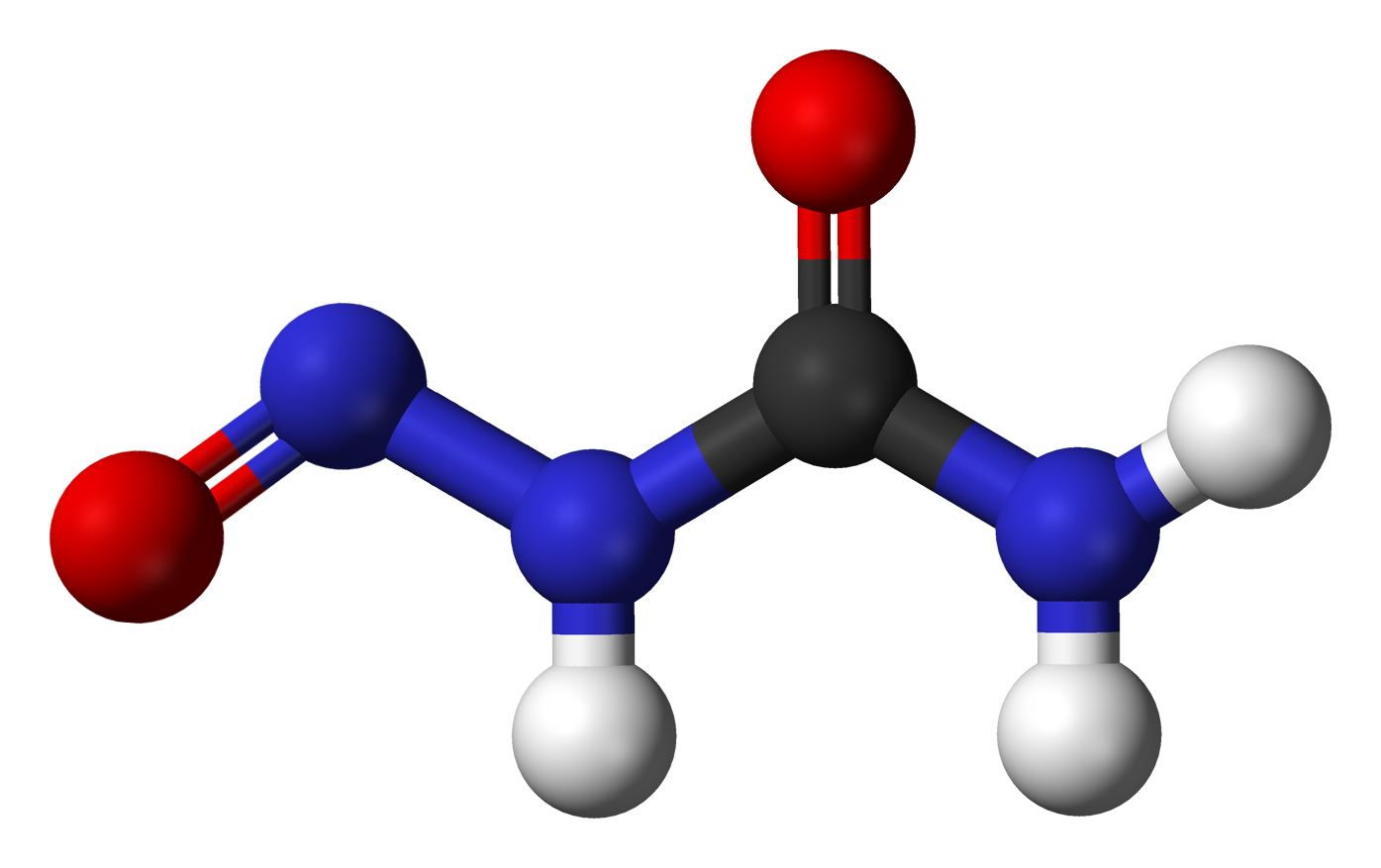
Ball and stick model a minor tautomer of nitrosourea

Names
- IUPAC name Nitrosourea

Identifiers
CAS Number	13010-20-3
3D model (JSmol)	Interactive image; Interactive image
ChemSpider	94772
PubChem CID	105035
UNII	S0W1V6314Y
CompTox Dashboard (EPA)	DTXSID80156337
- InChI: InChI=1S/CH3N3O2/c2-1(5)3-4-6/h(H3,2,3,5,6) Key: OSTGTTZJOCZWJG-UHFFFAOYSA-N
- SMILES: NC(=O)N=NO; C(=O)(N)NN=O

Properties
Chemical formula	CH_{3}N_{3}O_{2}
Molar mass	89.054 g·mol^{−1}
- Except where otherwise noted, data are given for materials in their standard state (at 25 °C [77 °F], 100 kPa). Infobox references

Nitrosoureas are organic compounds containing the subunit R_{2}NC(O)N(NO)R, where R can be alkyl, aryl, or H. These compounds are formally derived by the attachment of a nitroso group (NO) to the nitrogen atom of a urea R_{2}NC(O)NR_{2}. Urea is a naturally occurring, innocuous compound, but the nitrosoureas are highly active biochemically. They are sometimes uses for DNA crosslinking.

== Examples ==
Examples include:

- Arabinopyranosyl-N-methyl-N-nitrosourea (Aranose)
- Carmustine (BCNU, BiCNU)
- Chlorozotocin
- Ethylnitrosourea (ENU)
- Fotemustine
- Lomustine (CCNU)
- Nimustine
- N-Nitroso-N-methylurea (NMU)
- Ranimustine (MCNU)
- Semustine
- Streptozocin (Streptozotocin)

Nitrosourea compounds are DNA alkylating agents and are often used in chemotherapy. They are lipophilic and thus can cross the blood–brain barrier, making them useful in the treatment of brain tumors such as glioblastoma multiforme.

Arabinopyranosyl-N-methyl-N-nitrosourea

Carmustine

Chlorozotocin

Ethylnitrosourea

Fotemustine

Lomustine
N-Nitroso-N-methylurea

Nimustine

Ranimustine

Semustine

Streptozocin

== Side effects ==
Some nitrosoureas (e.g. lomustine) have been associated with the development of interstitial lung disease.
