= Rubitecan =

Chemical compound

Clinical data
- Trade names: Orathecin
- Other names: 9-Nitrocamptothecin; 9-NC; 9-Nitro-20(S)-camptothecin; Camptogen; (19S)-19-Ethyl-19-hydroxy-10-nitro-17-oxa-3,13-diazapentacyclo[11.8.0.0^{2,11}.0^{4,9}.0^{15,20}]henicosa- 1(21),2,4,6,8,10,15(20)-heptaene-14,18-dione
- Routes of administration: Oral (capsules)
- ATC code: None

Legal status
- Legal status: Application withdrawn

Pharmacokinetic data
- Bioavailability: 25–30% (rubitecan and 9-AC; in dogs)
- Protein binding: 97% (rubitecan), 65% (9-AC)
- Metabolism: Probably CYP-dependent
- Metabolites: 9-Aminocamptothecin (9-AC)
- Elimination half-life: 15–18 hours (rubitecan), 18–22 hours (9-AC)
- Excretion: Bile and feces (major proportion), urine (the minor one)

Identifiers
- IUPAC name: (4S)-4-Ethyl-4-hydroxy-11-nitro-1H-pyrano[3',4':6,7]indolizino[1,2-b]quinoline-3,14(4H,12H)-dione
- CAS Number: 91421-42-0
- PubChem CID: 472335
- ChemSpider: 414807
- UNII: H19C446XXB
- KEGG: D04031
- ChEBI: CHEBI:90225
- ChEMBL: ChEMBL77305
- CompTox Dashboard (EPA): DTXSID7046752

Chemical and physical data
- Formula: C_{20}H_{15}N_{3}O_{6}
- Molar mass: 393.355 g·mol^{−1}
- 3D model (JSmol): Interactive image
- SMILES: CC[C@@]1(C2=C(COC1=O)C(=O)N3CC4=CC5=C(C=CC=C5[N+](=O)[O-])N=C4C3=C2)O
- InChI: InChI=1S/C20H15N3O6/c1-2-20(26)13-7-16-17-10(8-22(16)18(24)12(13)9-29-19(20)25)6-11-14(21-17)4-3-5-15(11)23(27)28/h3-7,26H,2,8-9H2,1H3/t20-/m0/s1; Key:VHXNKPBCCMUMSW-FQEVSTJZSA-N

Rubitecan (INN, trade name Orathecin) is an oral topoisomerase inhibitor, developed by SuperGen (now Astex Pharmaceuticals, a member of the Otsuka Group).

== History ==
On January 27, 2004, SuperGen announced that it has completed the submission of an NDA for rubitecan to the US FDA, and was accepted for filing in March 2004.

In January 2005, and under the direction of then-CEO James Manuso, SuperGen withdrew the NDA for rubitecan, based on feedback indicating that the current data package would not be sufficient to gain US approval, and in January 2006, the Marketing Authorization Application (MAA) filed with the European Medicines Agency (EMA) was also withdrawn.

The name rubitecan is a portmanteau of SuperGen's founder, Joseph Rubinfeld, and the chemical name 9-nitrocamptothecin.

== Synthesis ==
Large scale production of rubitecan has encountered problems. The direct nitration of camptothecin results in regioselectivity problems. One way that has been used to synthesize Rubitecan is to nitrate 10-hydroxycamptothecin then remove the hydroxyl functional group.

== Use as anticancer drug ==
Rubitecan is a compound used extensively in cancer research. Rubitecan is an effective drug against pancreatic cancer and other solid tumors. One major problem is the lack of oral bioavailability due to low permeability and poor water solubility. One study shows 9-NC-SD through Soluplus1-based solid dispersion system is a much more effective delivery method than free 9-NC.
