= Pingyangmycin =

Glycopeptide antibiotic used to treat various cancers

Clinical data
- Other names: Bleomycin A5
- Pregnancy category: D
- Routes of administration: intravenous, intra-arterial, intramuscular, intratumoral

Legal status
- Legal status: In general: ℞ (Prescription only)

Pharmacokinetic data
- Metabolism: amidase
- Elimination half-life: 1.3 hours
- Excretion: renal (25-50%)

Identifiers
- IUPAC name: (2R,3S,4S,5R,6R)-2-{[(2R,3S,4S,5S,6S)-2-{[(1R,2S)-2-[({6-Amino-2-[(1S)-3-amino-1-{[(2S)-2,3-diamino-3-oxopropyl]amino}-3-oxopropyl]-5-methyl-4-pyrimidinyl}carbonyl)amino]-3-{[(2R,3S,4S)-5-{[(2S,3R)-1- ({2-[4-({3-[(4-aminobutyl)amino]propyl}carbamoyl)-2,4'-bi-1,3-thiazol-2'-yl]ethyl}amino)-3-hydroxy-1-oxo-2-butanyl]amino}-3-hydroxy-4-methyl-5-oxo-2-pentanyl]amino}-1-(1H-imidazol-5-yl)-3-oxopropyl]oxy}-4,5-dihydroxy-6-(hydroxymethyl)tetrahydro-2H-pyran-3-yl]oxy}-3,5-dihydroxy-6-(hydroxymethyl)tetrahydro-2H-pyran-4-yl carbamate
- CAS Number: 11116-32-8 55658-47-4 (hydrochloride)
- PubChem CID: 84046
- ChemSpider: 8232875
- UNII: 5DY91Y7601
- ECHA InfoCard: 100.031.221

Chemical and physical data
- Formula: C_{57}H_{89}N_{19}O_{21}S_{2}
- Molar mass: 1440.57 g·mol^{−1}
- 3D model (JSmol): Interactive image
- SMILES: C[C@@H](O)[C@H](NC(=O)[C@@H](C)[C@H](O)[C@@H](C)NC(=O)[C@@H](NC(=O)c1nc(nc(N)c1C)[C@H](CC(N)=O)NC[C@H](N)C(N)=O)[C@@H](O[C@@H]1O[C@@H](CO)[C@@H](O)[C@H](O)[C@@H]1O[C@H]1O[C@H](CO)[C@@H](O)[C@H](OC(N)=O)[C@@H]1O)c1c[nH]cn1)C(=O)NCCc1nc(cs1)-c1nc(cs1)C(=O)NCCCNCCCCN
- InChI: InChI=1S/C57H89N19O21S2/c1-22-35(73-48(76-46(22)61)27(14-33(60)80)68-15-26(59)47(62)86)52(90)75-37(43(28-16-65-21-69-28)95-56-45(41(84)39(82)31(17-77)94-56)96-55-42(85)44(97-57(63)92)40(83)32(18-78)93-55)53(91)70-24(3)38(81)23(2)49(87)74-36(25(4)79)51(89)67-13-8-34-71-30(20-98-34)54-72-29(19-99-54)50(88)66-12-7-11-64-10-6-5-9-58/h16,19-21,23-27,31-32,36-45,55-56,64,68,77-79,81-85H,5-15,17-18,58-59H2,1-4H3,(H2,60,80)(H2,62,86)(H2,63,92)(H,65,69)(H,66,88)(H,67,89)(H,70,91)(H,74,87)(H,75,90)(H2,61,73,76)/t23-,24+,25+,26-,27-,31-,32+,36-,37-,38-,39+,40+,41-,42-,43-,44-,45-,55+,56-/m0/s1; Key:QYOAUOAXCQAEMW-UTXKDXHTSA-N

Pingyangmycin (also known as bleomycin A_{5}) is an antitumor glycopeptide antibiotic belonging to the bleomycin family, which is produced by Streptomyces verticillus var. pingyangensis n.sp., a variety of Streptomyces verticillus. It was discovered in 1969 at Pingyang County of Zhejiang Province in China, and was brought into clinical use in 1978.

In China, pingyangmycin has largely superseded bleomycin A_{2} (commonly known as "bleomycin"), since according to Chinese sources it is more effective, costs less, is easier to get, can treat a larger variety of cancers (such as breast cancer and liver cancer) and causes less lung injury. Though pingyangmycin and bleomycin can each cause pulmonary fibrosis, pingyangmycin's most serious side effect - which it does not share with bleomycin - is anaphylactic shock, which is rare, but may happen even in a low dose, and can be fatal. In addition, it causes a higher incidence of fever than bleomycin; the occurrence of this complication in patients is between 20 and 50%.
