= Chlorozotocin =

Chemical compound

Clinical data
- ATC code: none

Identifiers
- IUPAC name: 2-{[(2-Chloroethyl)(nitroso)carbamoyl]amino}-2-deoxy-D-glucose
- CAS Number: 54749-90-5
- PubChem CID: 451706
- ChemSpider: 397854
- UNII: 3053LTY75Z
- KEGG: C19170
- ChEMBL: ChEMBL2094020
- CompTox Dashboard (EPA): DTXSID9020320

Chemical and physical data
- Formula: C_{9}H_{16}ClN_{3}O_{7}
- Molar mass: 313.69 g·mol^{−1}
- 3D model (JSmol): Interactive image
- SMILES: ClCCN(N=O)C(=O)N[C@@H](C=O)[C@@H](O)[C@H](O)[C@H](O)CO
- InChI: InChI=1S/C9H16ClN3O7/c10-1-2-13(12-20)9(19)11-5(3-14)7(17)8(18)6(16)4-15/h3,5-8,15-18H,1-2,4H2,(H,11,19)/t5-,6+,7+,8+/m0/s1; Key:MKQWTWSXVILIKJ-LXGUWJNJSA-N

Chlorozotocin is a nitrosourea. It is used for cancer therapy.

The International Agency for Research on Cancer concluded it was "probably carcinogenic" in 1990

It is an analogue of streptozotocin.
