= Nimustine =

Chemical compound

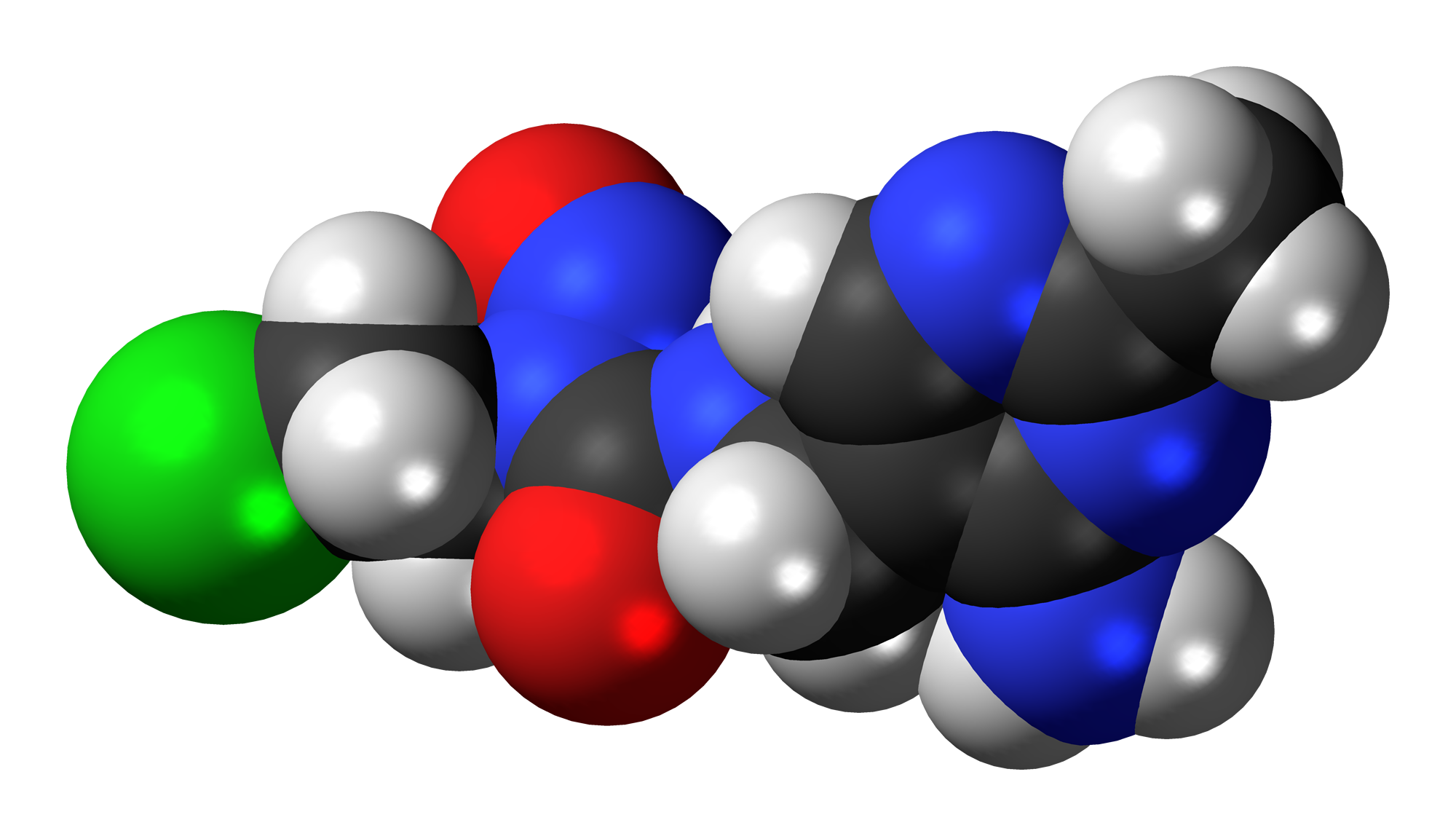

Clinical data
- AHFS/Drugs.com: International Drug Names
- Routes of administration: Intravenous
- ATC code: L01AD06 (WHO)

Legal status
- Legal status: In general: ℞ (Prescription only)

Identifiers
- IUPAC name: N'-[(4-amino-2-methylpyrimidin-5-yl)methyl]-N-(2-chloroethyl)-N-nitrosourea
- CAS Number: 42471-28-3
- PubChem CID: 39214
- ChemSpider: 35876
- UNII: 0S726V972K
- KEGG: D08276
- ChEBI: CHEBI:75270
- CompTox Dashboard (EPA): DTXSID0045179
- ECHA InfoCard: 100.050.744

Chemical and physical data
- Formula: C_{9}H_{13}ClN_{6}O_{2}
- Molar mass: 272.69 g·mol^{−1}
- 3D model (JSmol): Interactive image
- SMILES: CC1=NC=C(C(=N1)N)CNC(=O)N(CCCl)N=O
- InChI: InChI=1S/C9H13ClN6O2/c1-6-12-4-7(8(11)14-6)5-13-9(17)16(15-18)3-2-10/h4H,2-3,5H2,1H3,(H,13,17)(H2,11,12,14); Key:VFEDRRNHLBGPNN-UHFFFAOYSA-N

Nimustine (INN) is a nitrosourea alkylating agent.

It is used to treat malignant brain tumors and has proven to be rather effective.
