= Norcantharidin =

Names
- Other names Endothall anhydride; 3,6-Endoxohexahydrophthalic anhydride

Identifiers
CAS Number	5442-12-6
3D model (JSmol)	Interactive image
ChEMBL	ChEMBL1237212
ChemSpider	8053159
ECHA InfoCard	100.165.000
PubChem CID	9877482
UNII	8452E71EO7
CompTox Dashboard (EPA)	DTXSID30884158
- InChI: InChI=1S/C8H8O4/c9-7-5-3-1-2-4(11-3)6(5)8(10)12-7/h3-6H,1-2H2/t3-,4+,5-,6+ Key: JAABVEXCGCXWRR-FBXFSONDSA-N
- SMILES: C1C[C@H]2[C@H]3[C@@H]([C@@H]1O2)C(=O)OC3=O

Properties
Chemical formula	C_{8}H_{8}O_{4}
Molar mass	168.148 g·mol^{−1}
Appearance	white, solid
Melting point	115 °C (239 °F; 388 K)

Hazards
- Occupational safety and health (OHS/OSH)
Main hazards	Xi
- Except where otherwise noted, data are given for materials in their standard state (at 25 °C [77 °F], 100 kPa). Infobox references

Norcantharidin is a synthetic anticancer compound.
