= Klaus Grohe =

German medicinal chemist (born 1934)

- Born: Klaus Peter Grohe; January 16, 1934 (age 92); Ludwigshafen am Rhein, Germany
- Education: University of Würzburg (PhD, 1964)
- Known for: Grohe method (quinolone synthesis); synthesis of Ciprofloxacin
- Awards: Otto Bayer Medal (1987, 2001); Cross of Merit 1st Class of the Federal Republic of Germany (2005); honorary title "Professor" (North Rhine-Westphalia, 2010)
- Scientific career
- Fields: Medicinal chemistry
- Workplaces: Bayer AG (1965–1997)

Klaus Peter Grohe (born 16 January 1934) is a German chemist best known for pioneering work on quinolone and fluoroquinolone antibiotics at Bayer AG, including the invention of Ciprofloxacin. He developed a widely adopted synthetic approach known as the "Grohe method" for constructing quinolone carboxylic acids, which underpinned later fluoroquinolone discovery programs. In retirement, he and his wife established the Klaus Grohe Foundation (Klaus-Grohe-Stiftung) to support young researchers in drug discovery and medicinal chemistry.

== Early life and education ==
Grohe was born in Ludwigshafen am Rhein on 16 January 1934. He studied chemistry at the University of Würzburg, where he completed a doctorate in 1964 on the synthesis of pyridine derivatives.

== Career ==
Grohe joined the main research laboratory of Bayer in Leverkusen in 1965. After early work on organochlorine and organofluorine intermediates he moved into heterocycle synthesis for pharmaceutical research. In the 1970s he devised a new cyclocondensation strategy using o-halo(aroyl) halides to access quinoline and azaquinoline carboxylic acids—an approach that became known as the Grohe method. This methodology enabled the synthesis, in April 1981, of the fluoroquinolone antibiotics ciprofloxacin and enrofloxacin.

Grohe is named as an inventor on core ciprofloxacin patents, including US 4,670,444 (reexamined as US 4,670,444 B1). Court records from patent litigation in the United States have described the synthetic route and prior steps leading to ciprofloxacin within Bayer's program.

He retired from Bayer in 1997.

== Research and impact ==
According to the German Chemical Society, "nearly all modern fluoroquinolone antibiotics are synthesized using the Grohe method," and subsequent optimization under Grohe's supervision at Bayer contributed to later agents such as moxifloxacin and pradofloxacin. Reviews of drug-discovery history and heterocycle-based medicines also credit Grohe's role in the origin of ciprofloxacin.

== Awards and honors ==
- Otto Bayer Medal (1987), for work leading to the synthesis of ciprofloxacin; and again (2001) for lifetime achievements.
- Cross of Merit 1st Class of the Order of Merit of the Federal Republic of Germany (2005).
- Honorary title Professor conferred by the State of North Rhine-Westphalia (2010).

== Philanthropy ==
In 2001 Grohe and his wife Eva established the Klaus Grohe Foundation at the German Chemical Society (GDCh). The foundation has awarded the Klaus Grohe Prize (since 2020 the Klaus Grohe Award) for outstanding work in drug discovery; since 2020 it has been endowed with €50,000 and focuses on scientists working in Europe. Grohe and his wife also endowed the Eva and Klaus Grohe Prize (Berlin-Brandenburg Academy of Sciences and Humanities), awarded in 2003–2015 for achievements in infectiology.

== Selected patents ==
- K. Grohe; H.-J. Zeiler; K. G. Metzger, "… quinoline/naphthyridine-3-carboxylic acids" (ciprofloxacin family), US 4,670,444; reexam. US 4,670,444 B1.
- Formulations containing ciprofloxacin and related actives, US 4,844,902.
