= Floxacin =

Floxacin can refer to

- a trade name of the antibiotic ofloxacin
- -floxacin, the common stem of fluoroquinolone antibiotics
