= C19H22FN3O3 =

The molecular formula C_{19}H_{22}FN_{3}O_{3} (molar mass: 359.39 g/mol, exact mass: 359.1645 u) may refer to:

- Enrofloxacin (ENR)
- Grepafloxacin
