= Operan =

- Ofloxacin, a drug
- Royal Swedish Opera, colloquially known as Operan in Sweden
- Finnish National Opera, colloquially known as Operan among Swedish-speaking Finns
