= Clinafloxacin =

Chemical compound

Clinical data
- Other names: AM-1091, CI-960, PD127391
- Routes of administration: oral, IV
- ATC code: none

Pharmacokinetic data
- Bioavailability: 90% (oral)
- Protein binding: 0-10%
- Elimination half-life: 6.1 hours

Identifiers
- IUPAC name: 7-(3-Aminopyrrolidin-1-yl)-8-chloro-1-cyclopropyl-6-fluoro-4-oxoquinoline-3-carboxylic acid
- CAS Number: 105956-97-6; HCl: 105956-99-8
- PubChem CID: 60062
- ChemSpider: 54184
- UNII: 8N86XTF9QD; HCl: G17M59V0FY
- KEGG: D02539
- ChEMBL: ChEMBL278255
- CompTox Dashboard (EPA): DTXSID80869455
- ECHA InfoCard: 100.229.374

Chemical and physical data
- Formula: C_{17}H_{17}ClFN_{3}O_{3}
- Molar mass: 365.79 g·mol^{−1}
- 3D model (JSmol): Interactive image
- SMILES: Fc2c(c(Cl)c1N(/C=C(/C(=O)O)C(=O)c1c2)C3CC3)N4CCC(N)C4

Clinafloxacin is an investigational fluoroquinolone antibiotic. Despite its promising antibiotic activity, the clinical development of clinafloxacin has been hampered by its risk for inducing serious side effects.

== Medical uses ==
Clinafloxacin has not been approved for any indication. The investigational new drug application was withdrawn by the manufacturer in 1999, citing safety concerns.

=== Available forms ===
Clinafloxacin is available in both oral and intravenous formulations.

=== Specific populations ===
There is a warning against using clinafloxacin in pregnant patients, due to possible damage to the developing fetus.

== Adverse effects ==
The use of clinafloxacin is associated with drug-induced light sensitivity (phototoxicity) and low blood sugar. Diarrhea has also been reported.

The phototoxicity with clinafloxacin has been more associated with oral dosing as compared to intravenous dosing, though the studies that described this were subject to confounding by study site (that is, patients that received intravenous clinafloxacin were less mobile, and thereby received less sunlight exposure).

The mechanism for clinafloxacin's phototoxicity involves the chlorine atom at position 8. In the presence of ultraviolet light, the chemical structure of clinafloxacin is degraded, resulting in the formation of toxic, reactive oxygen species that can damage cellular structures—including DNA. For this reason clinafloxacin can also be classified as a photocarcinogen (a chemical that can cause light-induced cancer), though the risk of developing cancer in humans taking the medication is small.

The mechanism for clinafloxacin's effect on blood glucose is thought to involve stimulation of the pancreatic beta cells, which produce insulin (a hormone that lowers blood glucose levels).

The symptoms of clinafloxacin overdose are unknown.

== Interactions ==
=== Drug-drug interactions ===
Clinafloxacin inhibits multiple CYP450 drug metabolizing enzymes, especially CYP1A2. Clinafloxacin has induced the accumulation of CYP1A2 substrates, including theophylline, at therapeutic doses. This can also affect the metabolism of caffeine, another CYP1A2 substrate. Caffeine consumption must be limited while taking clinafloxacin to prevent caffeine accumulation and overdose.

There is also a known interaction of clinafloxacin with phenytoin, resulting in a decrease in the clearance of phenytoin from the body. The increase in INR seen in patients taking both clinafloxacin and the anticoagulant warfarin has yet to be fully elucidated.

=== Food-drug interactions ===
There are no known food-drug interactions with clinafloxacin.

== Pharmacology ==
=== Mechanism of action ===
Clinafloxacin's antibiotic mechanism of action, like other fluoroquinolones is derived from its activity against type II topoisomerases DNA gyrase and topoisomerase IV.

Clinafloxacin has been described as a broad-spectrum antibiotic due to its activity against Gram-positive and Gram-negative bacteria. In addition, clinafloxacin has antibiotic activity against anaerobic bacteria, including the facultative anaerobe Pseudomonas aeruginosa. Clinafloxacin's activity against anaerobic bacteria is higher than that of most other fluoroquinolones, including ciprofloxacin, levofloxacin, and moxifloxacin.

=== Pharmacokinetics ===
The time that it takes for serum concentrations of clinafloxacin to reach the maximum concentration (Cmax) in healthy volunteers after taking a dose by mouth is 0.7 hours. The elimination half-life in humans is 6.1 hours. Steady state levels of clinafloxacin are achieved in 3 days of twice daily dosing by mouth in healthy volunteers.

About half of an administered clinafloxacin dose is found unchanged in the urine, meaning that the drug is cleared from the blood stream roughly equally by hepatic metabolism (liver-induced degradation) and renal elimination (kidney-mediated removal).

== Chemistry ==
Clinafloxacin is a fluoroquinolone, structurally related to other fluoroquinolones like ciprofloxacin. It is soluble in methanol (about 2 mg/mL at 25 °C) and water.

== History ==
In the 1990s, clinafloxacin showed promise as a novel, broad-spectrum fluoroquinolone antibiotic. However, further clinical trials raised serious concerns regarding its safety in humans, citing dangerously low blood sugar, drug-induced light sensitivity, and multiple drug-drug interactions.

== Research ==
Clinical trials have been done to assess its efficacy in sepsis and other serious and potentially life-threatening infections.

== See also ==
- Adverse effects of fluoroquinolones
