= Amfonelic acid =

Chemical compound

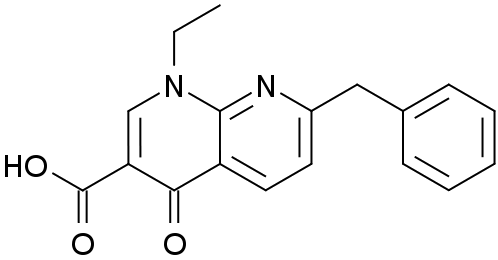

Clinical data
- ATC code: none

Legal status
- Legal status: In general: uncontrolled

Identifiers
- IUPAC name: 7-benzyl-1-ethyl-4-oxo-1,4-dihydro-1,8-naphthyridine-3-carboxylic acid
- CAS Number: 15180-02-6
- PubChem CID: 2137
- ChemSpider: 2052
- UNII: RR302AR19Y
- KEGG: D02897
- ChEMBL: ChEMBL35337
- CompTox Dashboard (EPA): DTXSID40164877

Chemical and physical data
- Formula: C_{18}H_{16}N_{2}O_{3}
- Molar mass: 308.337 g·mol^{−1}
- 3D model (JSmol): Interactive image
- SMILES: CCN1C=C(C(=O)C2=C1N=C(C=C2)CC3=CC=CC=C3)C(=O)O
- InChI: InChI=1S/C18H16N2O3/c1-2-20-11-15(18(22)23)16(21)14-9-8-13(19-17(14)20)10-12-6-4-3-5-7-12/h3-9,11H,2,10H2,1H3,(H,22,23); Key:WHHHJDGNBVQNAU-UHFFFAOYSA-N

Amfonelic acid (AFA; WIN 25,978) is a research chemical and dopaminergic stimulant with antibiotic properties. Limited clinical trials have been conducted, and it is primarily used in scientific research.

== History ==
The stimulant properties of AFA were discovered incidentally at Sterling-Winthrop during research on the antibiotic nalidixic acid. In addition to behaving as an antibiotic, it was found that many derivatives of nalidixic acid have either stimulant or depressant effects on the central nervous system. Researchers at Sterling-Winthrop found that AFA had a higher potency and therapeutic index than cocaine or amphetamine, leading to further study of the drug. A small number of clinical trials were held in the 1970s, but clinical evaluation of AFA was discontinued after it was found that AFA exacerbated psychotic symptoms in schizophrenic patients and produced undesirable stimulant properties in geriatric depressives. AFA remains a widely used pharmacological tool for study of the brain's reward system, dopamine pathways, and the dopamine transporter. Since 2013, AFA has been sold on the grey market and there are numerous anecdotal reports detailing its non-medical use.

== Pharmacology ==
In studies, it proved to be a potent and highly selective dopamine reuptake inhibitor (DRI) in rat brain preparations. A study found a moderately long half-life of approximately 12 hours and a dopaminergic potency approximately 50 fold that of methylphenidate in rat brain preparations. Despite lack of direct serotonin activity, rats treated with subchronic doses of amfonelic acid display subsequent decreases in 5HT and 5HIAA. Amfonelic acid displays no activity in the norepinephrine system.

Despite its different mechanism of action, amfonelic acid displays discriminatory substitution with 150% the stimulant potency of dextroamphetamine. Amfonelic acid has been shown to be neuroprotective against methamphetamine damage to dopamine neurons. It also increases the effects of the antipsychotic drugs haloperidol, trifluoperazine and spiperone. Rats are shown to self-administer amfonelic acid in a dose-dependent manner.

Though AFA was discovered in the course of antibiotic research, there is very little data available on the drug's antimicrobial activity. In 1988, the biologist G.C. Crumplin wrote, "[AFA] is less active against bacteria than are many other 4-quinolones, but studies in our laboratory on selected mammalian cell lines have shown it to be markedly more toxic to these cells than are the 4-quinolones that are more active antibacterial agents. Furthermore, it can be shown that sublethal doses induced marked changes in the pattern of proteins produced by the cell, thus suggesting a possible effect of 4-quinolones on gene transcription in mammalian cells." When evaluated via broth microdilution the MIC of AFA for Escherichia coli is 125 μg/mL, a concentration thirty times higher than the MIC for nalidixic acid in the same E. coli strain.

== See also ==
- Nalidixic acid (WIN 18,320)
- Oxolinic acid
- Pipemidic acid
- A-77636
