= Difloxacin =

Chemical compound

Clinical data
- AHFS/Drugs.com: International Drug Names
- Routes of administration: Oral
- ATCvet code: QJ01MA94 (WHO)

Identifiers
- IUPAC name: 6-fluoro-1-(4-fluorophenyl)-7-(4-methylpiperazin-1-yl)- 4-oxoquinoline-3-carboxylic acid
- CAS Number: 98106-17-3 91296-86-5 (HCl)
- PubChem CID: 56206
- ChemSpider: 50725
- UNII: 5Z7OO9FNFD
- KEGG: D07828
- ChEBI: CHEBI:4537
- ChEMBL: ChEMBL6259
- CompTox Dashboard (EPA): DTXSID5048348

Chemical and physical data
- Formula: C_{21}H_{19}F_{2}N_{3}O_{3}
- Molar mass: 399.398 g·mol^{−1}
- 3D model (JSmol): Interactive image
- SMILES: Fc1ccc(cc1)N\3c2cc(c(F)cc2C(=O)C(/C(=O)O)=C/3)N4CCN(C)CC4
- InChI: InChI=1S/C21H19F2N3O3/c1-24-6-8-25(9-7-24)19-11-18-15(10-17(19)23)20(27)16(21(28)29)12-26(18)14-4-2-13(22)3-5-14/h2-5,10-12H,6-9H2,1H3,(H,28,29); Key:NOCJXYPHIIZEHN-UHFFFAOYSA-N

Difloxacin (INN), marketed under the trade name Dicural, is a second-generation, synthetic fluoroquinolone antibiotic used in veterinary medicine. It has broad-spectrum, concentration dependent, bactericidal activity; however, its efficacy is not as good as enrofloxacin or pradofloxacin.

== Indications and Usage ==
In 1997, the United States Food and Drug Administration approved difloxacin hydrochloride tablets for use in canines. Unlike other fluoroquinolones difloxacin has not been approved by the FDA for use in cats. It is also contraindicated for use in food animals.

The recommended dosing is 5–10 mg/kg once daily. This is based on the linear pharmacokinetics exhibited by difloxacin over the 5–60 mg/kg range. So the maximum dose is well within the established safety range, but drug accumulation in tissues prompts a recommendation that the medication should not be used for periods longer than thirty days. If there is no noticeable improvement after five days, then the condition should be reevaluated and all therapy options reconsidered. Difloxacin is indicated for infections caused by susceptible microorganisms in the conditions listed below.

- Treatment of skin and soft tissue infections till 2–3 days after clinical signs have ceased, up to a maximum of thirty days.
- Treatment of urinary tract infections for at least ten consecutive days.

=== Microbiology ===
Difloxacin is a bactericidal, broad-spectrum antibiotic that has activity against Gram-negative bacteria and Gram-positive bacteria. It exerts its antibacterial effect by interfering with the bacterial enzyme DNA gyrase, which is needed for the maintenance and synthesis of bacterial DNA. The minimum inhibitory concentrations (MICs) of pathogens isolated in clinical field trials conducted in the United States between 1991 and 1993 were determined using National Committee for Clinical Laboratory Standards (NCCLS).

== Mechanism of action ==
The primary mode of action of fluoroquinolones involves interaction with enzymes essential for major DNA functions such as replication, transcription and recombination. Difloxacin inhibits DNA gyrase (also known as Topoisomerase II), an enzyme required for negative super coiling during DNA replication Cell death can occur through the inability of bacteria to maintain the DNA super helical structure.

=== Pharmacokinetics ===
Difloxacin is rapidly and almost completely absorbed after oral administration, and approximately 50% is bound to circulating plasma proteins. It is metabolized primarily by the liver through glucuronidation and secreted in the bile. It can also be reabsorbed with the bile. This allows reentry into the blood stream and recirculation, a mechanism that can extend the half-life. The longer half-life allows for once daily dosing. In contrast to other fluoroquinolones, renal clearance accounts for only 5% of the removal of difloxacin from the canine system, which makes it an attractive choice for dogs with compromised renal function.

Table 2. Plasma pharmacokinetics following administration of difloxacin tablets (5 mg/kg body weight) to dogs (n=20)
Pharmacokinetic Measure	Mean Value
Peak Plasma Concentration (C_{MAX})	1.8 mcg/mL
Time to Reach C_{MAX} (T_{MAX})	2.8 hours
Elimination Half-life (T_{1/2})	9.3 hours
Area Under the Plasma Curve (AUC_{0-∞})	14.5 mcg • hr/mL
Total Body Clearance/F^{a} (CL/F)	375 mL/kg/hr
Steady State Volume of Distribution/F^{b}	3.8 L/kg
Volume of Distribution (area)/F^{c}	4.7 L/kg

^{a} Total body clearance/F = Dose/AUC

^{b} Steady state volume of distribution/F = Dose•AUMC/AUC^{2}

^{c} Volume of distribution (area)/F = Vd_{β} = (T_{1/2})(CL/F)/0.693

As mentioned above, Difloxacin is not FDA-approved for use in cats. This is because the major route of metabolism is through glucuronidation, an enzymatic pathway that cats lack. Therefore, administration to cats would likely result in toxicity.

Difloxacin is stored at room temperature in a cool, dry place.

=== Chemical and Drug Interactions ===
Difloxacin has been used concurrently with ectoparasiticides, antiepileptics, anesthetics, antihistamines, and topical anti-inflammatory drugs without adverse effects. It inhibits the metabolism of theophylline, caffeine, cyclosporine and warfarin. Azlocillin, cimetidine and probenecid increase blood levels of difloxacin. Compounds (i.e. sucralfate, antacids, multivitamins) containing di- and trivalent cations (i.e. iron, aluminum, calcium, magnesium and zinc) may substantially interfere with the absorption of quinolones from the intestinal tract resulting in decreased bioavailability. Therefore, the concurrent oral administration of quinolones with foods, supplements or other preparations containing any of these compounds should be avoided.

== Adverse effects ==
Like other fluoroquinolones, difloxacin causes arthropathy in immature growing animals, particularly dogs. Otherwise, it is very well tolerated. The most common adverse effects are gastrointestinal effects such as vomiting, diarrhea and anorexia, even in overdose. Only supportive measures, and not additional treatment, are recommended for management of overdose or toxicity as the reactions are self-limiting.

Contraindications include small and medium breeds of dogs that are less than 8 months old; large breeds less than 12 months old; giant breeds less than 18 months old; those with suspected CNS disorders; and hypersensitivity to difloxacin or any other fluoroquinolone.

=== Human Warnings ===
Difloxacin has been approved for animal use only. Keep out of reach of children. Avoid contact with eyes. In case of contact, immediately flush eyes with copious amounts of water for fifteen minutes. In case of dermal contact, wash skin with soap and water. Consult a physician if symptoms persists following exposure. Individuals with a history of hypersensitivity to quinolones should avoid this product. In humans, there is a risk of user photosensitization within a few hours after excessive exposure to quinolones. If excessive accidental exposure occurs, avoid direct sunlight.

== Research ==
The minimum dose (5 mg/kg) was confirmed in a clinical trial performed by HTI Bio-services, Inc. It evaluated the effective dose for the treatment of an infected dermal wound. The study included forty-eight mixed breed dogs (both male and female) with weights ranging from 14.5-24.5 kilograms. These dogs were randomly placed into treatment groups. Once wounds were created, the dogs were inoculated with culture both containing both Escherichia coli and Klebsiella pneumoniae. Pertinent observations and measurements were then taken and tabulated. Culture scores were significantly reduced, confirming 5 mg/kg to be an effective dose.

Clinical field trials were also performed to evaluate both the efficacy and safety of difloxacin tablets. Clinical signs of bacterial infections were defined in a protocol. Dogs who presented to investigators with these signs were admitted into the study. In total, eighteen veterinarians located in four different geographical areas of the U.S. (Southeast, Midwest, Northwest, and West) conducted these clinical efficacy and safety evaluations.

== Society and Culture ==
=== Cost ===
Difloxacin tablets are not available to the public for over-the-counter purchase. It can only be obtained by prescription from a veterinarian. At least One company Turtle Pharma Private Limited provides industrial-size amounts.

=== Marketing ===
Dicural was sponsored by Fort Dodge Animal Health through New Animal Drug Application (NADA) 141-096. It offers veterinarians once-per-day dosing by providing excellent tissue penetration. Difloxacin can only be obtained either from a veterinarian or by a medical prescription from a veterinarian. It is available as the hydrochloride salt in scored tablets of different strengths for easier dosing adjustments. For differentiation, the milligram strengths, 11.4 mg, 45.4 mg and 136 mg, are colored blue, white and orange, respectively.

Fort Dodge Animal Health was acquired by Zoetis in 2009. In February 2012, the Municipality of Ulianopolis (State of Para, Brazil) filed a complaint against Fort Dodge Saúde Animal Ltda. (FDSAL) and five other large companies alleging that waste sent to a local waste incineration facility for destruction, but that was not ultimately destroyed as the facility lost its operating permit, caused environmental impacts requiring cleanup. The Municipality is seeking recovery of cleanup costs purportedly related to FDSAL's share of all waste accumulated at the incineration facility awaiting destruction, and compensatory damages to be allocated among the six defendants. The prosecutor granted a request for a face-to-face meeting on November 6, 2015.

== See also ==
- Quinolone
