= C17H18F3N3O3 =

The molecular formula C_{17}H_{18}F_{3}N_{3}O_{3} (molar mass: 369.338 g/mol) may refer to:

- Fleroxacin
- RU-58841
