= Sitafloxacin =

Chemical compound

Clinical data
- Routes of administration: Oral
- ATC code: J01MA21 (WHO)

Legal status
- Legal status: In general: ℞ (Prescription only)

Identifiers
- IUPAC name: 7-[(4S)-4-Amino-6-azaspiro[2.4]heptan-6-yl]-8-chloro-6-fluoro-1-[(2S)-2-fluorocyclopropyl]-4-oxoquinoline-3-carboxylic acid
- CAS Number: 127254-12-0
- PubChem CID: 461399
- ChemSpider: 405945
- UNII: 3GJC60U4Q8
- KEGG: D02475
- ChEMBL: ChEMBL108821
- CompTox Dashboard (EPA): DTXSID5048847

Chemical and physical data
- Formula: C_{19}H_{18}ClF_{2}N_{3}O_{3}
- Molar mass: 409.82 g·mol^{−1}
- 3D model (JSmol): Interactive image
- SMILES: F[C@H]5C[C@H]5N2/C=C(/C(=O)O)C(=O)c1cc(F)c(c(Cl)c12)N4C[C@@H](N)C3(CC3)C4
- InChI: InChI=1S/C19H18ClF2N3O3/c20-14-15-8(17(26)9(18(27)28)5-25(15)12-4-10(12)21)3-11(22)16(14)24-6-13(23)19(7-24)1-2-19/h3,5,10,12-13H,1-2,4,6-7,23H2,(H,27,28)/t10-,12+,13+/m0/s1; Key:PNUZDKCDAWUEGK-CYZMBNFOSA-N

Sitafloxacin (INN; also called DU-6859a) is a fluoroquinolone antibiotic that shows promise in the treatment of Buruli ulcer. The molecule was identified by Daiichi Sankyo Co., which brought ofloxacin and levofloxacin to the market. Sitafloxacin is currently marketed in Japan by Daiichi Sankyo under the tradename Gracevit.

== See also ==
- Quinolone
