= Enoxacin =

Chemical compound

Clinical data
- AHFS/Drugs.com: Monograph
- MedlinePlus: a601013
- Routes of administration: Oral
- ATC code: J01MA04 (WHO)

Identifiers
- IUPAC name: 1-ethyl-6-fluoro-4-oxo-7-(piperazin-1-yl)-1,4-dihydro-1,8-naphthyridine-3-carboxylic acid
- CAS Number: 74011-58-8
- PubChem CID: 3229
- DrugBank: DB00467
- ChemSpider: 3116
- UNII: 325OGW249P
- KEGG: D00310
- ChEBI: CHEBI:157175
- ChEMBL: ChEMBL826
- CompTox Dashboard (EPA): DTXSID5022984

Chemical and physical data
- Formula: C_{15}H_{17}FN_{4}O_{3}
- Molar mass: 320.324 g·mol^{−1}
- 3D model (JSmol): Interactive image
- Melting point: 220 to 224 °C (428 to 435 °F)
- SMILES: Fc1c(nc2c(c1)C(=O)C(\C(=O)O)=C/N2CC)N3CCNCC3
- InChI: InChI=1S/C15H17FN4O3/c1-2-19-8-10(15(22)23)12(21)9-7-11(16)14(18-13(9)19)20-5-3-17-4-6-20/h7-8,17H,2-6H2,1H3,(H,22,23); Key:IDYZIJYBMGIQMJ-UHFFFAOYSA-N

Enoxacin (Note: Enoxacin is sold under the following trade names: Almitil, Bactidan, Bactidron, Comprecin, Enoksetin, Enoxen, Enroxil, Enoxin, Enoxor, Flumark, Penetrex, Gyramid, Vinone.) is an oral broad-spectrum fluoroquinolone antibacterial agent used in the treatment of urinary tract infections and gonorrhea. Insomnia is a common adverse effect. It is no longer available in the United States.

Enoxacin may have cancer inhibiting effect.

== Mechanism of action ==
Quinolones and fluoroquinolones are bactericidal drugs, eradicating bacteria by interfering with DNA replication. Like other fluoroquinolones, enoxacin functions by inhibiting bacterial DNA gyrase and topoisomerase IV. The inhibition of these enzymes prevents bacterial DNA replication, transcription, repair and recombination. Enoxacin inhibits the expression of the microRNA mir-34-5p, leading to an increase in the lifespan of the nematode C. elegans. Enoxacin is active against many Gram-positive bacteria. (Note: Examples of Gram-positive bacteria include: Staphylococcus aureus, Staphylococcus epidermidis, Clostridium perfringens.) The quinolone is also active against Gram-negative bacteria. (Note: Gram-negative bacteria include: Acinetobacter, Citrobacter, Campylobacter, Escherichia coli, Haemophilus influenzae, Klebsiella pneumoniae, Moraxella catarrhalis, Serratia marcescens, Pseudomonas aeruginosa, Proteus mirabilis, Proteus vulgaris, Salmonella, Shigella flexneri.)

== Pharmacokinetics ==
After oral administration enoxacin is rapidly and well absorbed from the gastrointestinal tract. The antibiotic is widely distributed throughout the body and in the different biological tissues. Tissue concentrations often exceed serum concentrations. The binding of enoxacin to serum proteins is 35 to 40%. The serum elimination half-life, in subjects with normal renal function, is approximately 6 hours. Approximately 60% of an orally administered dose is excreted in the urine as unchanged drug within 24 hours. A small amount of a dose of drug administered is excreted in the bile. High concentrations of the fluoroquinolone are reached in the urinary tract and this fact ensures an antibacterial effect continued over time, particularly in this district.

== Medical uses ==
Enoxacin can be used to treat a wide variety of infections, particularly gastroenteritis including infectious diarrhea, respiratory tract infections, gonorrhea and urinary tract infections.

== Adverse effects ==
Enoxacin, like other fluoroquinolones, is known to trigger seizures or lower the seizure threshold. The compound should not be administered to patients with epilepsy or a personal history of previous convulsive attacks as it may promote the onset of these disorders.

== Contraindications ==
Enoxacin is contraindicated in subjects with a history of hypersensitivity to the substance or any other member of the quinolone class, or any component of the medicine. Enoxacin, like other fluoroquinolones, can cause degenerative changes in weightbearing joints of young animals. The compound should only be used in children when the expected benefits are outweigh the risks.

== Interactions ==
- Fenbufen: co-administration with some quinolones, including enoxacin may increase the risk of seizures. For this reason, concomitant administration of fenbufen and the quinolone should be avoided, as a precaution.
- Theophylline: in patients treated concurrently with theophylline and enoxacin, concentrations of the methylxanthine in plasma arise due to a reduced metabolic clearance of theophylline.
- Ranitidine, sucralfate, antacids containing magnesium or aluminium, supplements containing calcium, iron, or zinc: co-administration with these substances can lead to therapeutic failure of the antibiotic due to decreased absorption by the intestinal tract. For example, magnesium or aluminium antacids turn enoxacin into insoluble salts that are not readily absorbed by the gastroenteric tract.
