= Sarafloxacin =

Chemical compound

Clinical data
- AHFS/Drugs.com: International Drug Names
- ATCvet code: QJ01MA98 (WHO)

Identifiers
- IUPAC name: 6-fluoro-1-(4-fluorophenyl)-4-oxo-7-piperazin-1-ylquinoline-3-carboxylic acid
- CAS Number: 98105-99-8
- PubChem CID: 56208
- ChemSpider: 50727
- UNII: RC3WJ907XY
- ChEMBL: ChEMBL37858
- CompTox Dashboard (EPA): DTXSID8048494

Chemical and physical data
- Formula: C_{20}H_{17}F_{2}N_{3}O_{3}
- Molar mass: 385.371 g·mol^{−1}
- 3D model (JSmol): Interactive image
- SMILES: Fc1ccc(cc1)N\3c2cc(c(F)cc2C(=O)C(/C(=O)O)=C/3)N4CCNCC4
- InChI: InChI=1S/C20H17F2N3O3/c21-12-1-3-13(4-2-12)25-11-15(20(27)28)19(26)14-9-16(22)18(10-17(14)25)24-7-5-23-6-8-24/h1-4,9-11,23H,5-8H2,(H,27,28); Key:XBHBWNFJWIASRO-UHFFFAOYSA-N

Sarafloxacin (INN) is a quinolone antibiotic drug, which was removed from clinical use by its manufacturer Abbott Laboratories from April 30, 2001.

== See also ==
- Quinolone
- Adverse effects of fluoroquinolones
