= Balofloxacin =

Chemical compound

Clinical data
- ATC code: none

Identifiers
- IUPAC name: 1-Cyclopropyl-6-fluoro-8-methoxy-7-(3-methylaminopiperidin-1-yl)-4-oxoquinoline-3-carboxylic acid
- CAS Number: 127294-70-6
- PubChem CID: 65958
- ChemSpider: 59361
- UNII: Q022B63JPM
- ChEMBL: ChEMBL1210954
- CompTox Dashboard (EPA): DTXSID5046695

Chemical and physical data
- Formula: C_{20}H_{24}FN_{3}O_{4}
- Molar mass: 389.427 g·mol^{−1}
- 3D model (JSmol): Interactive image
- SMILES: CNC1CCCN(C1)C2=C(C=C3C(=C2OC)N(C=C(C3=O)C(=O)O)C4CC4)F
- InChI: InChI=1S/C20H24FN3O4/c1-22-11-4-3-7-23(9-11)17-15(21)8-13-16(19(17)28-2)24(12-5-6-12)10-14(18(13)25)20(26)27/h8,10-12,22H,3-7,9H2,1-2H3,(H,26,27); Key:MGQLHRYJBWGORO-UHFFFAOYSA-N

Balofloxacin (INN) is a fluoroquinolone antibiotic. It is sold under the brand name Q-Roxin in Korea, and under various names in India. It is not approved by the FDA for use in the United States.

== Pharmacodynamics ==
Balofloxacin is a fluoroquinolone that has a broad spectrum in vitro activity against a wide range of Gram-positive and Gram-negative bacteria, with enhanced activity against Gram positive bacteria, including MRSA and Streptococcus pneumoniae. It functions by inhibiting the action of DNA-gyrase, preventing bacterial cells from reproducing or repairing themselves, resulting in cellular death.

== Side Effects ==
Vomiting, headache, dizziness, stomach pain, nausea, diarrhea and decreased liver function are the most common side effects. In rare cases, Balofloxacin can lead to or worsen tendinitis, and muscular damage.

== See also ==
- Quinolone antibiotics
