= Rufloxacin =

Chemical compound

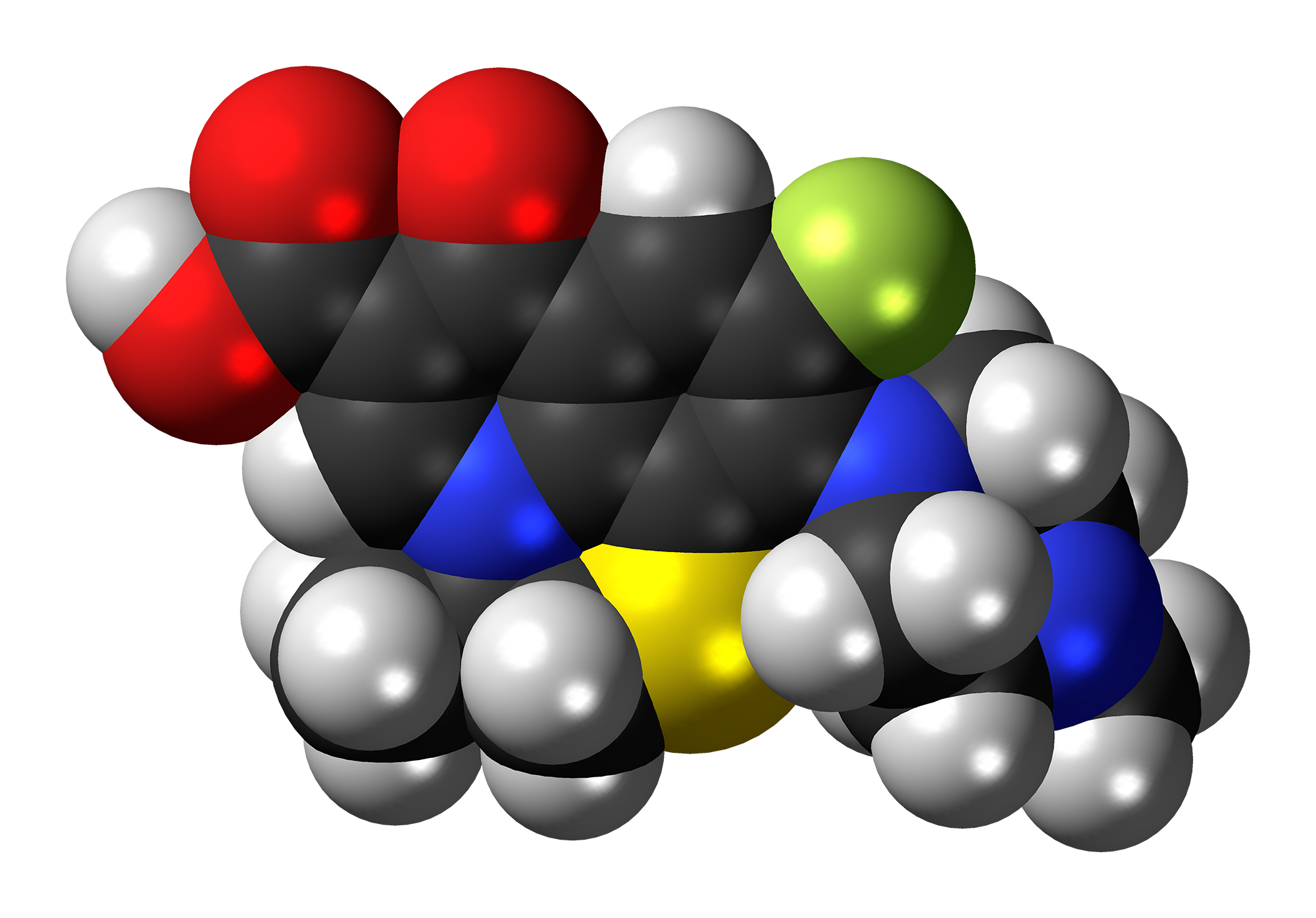

Clinical data
- Other names: 7-Fluoro-6-(4-methylpiperazin-1-yl)-10-oxo-4-thia-1-azatricyclo[7.3.1.0^{5,13}]trideca-5(13),6,8,11-tetraene-11-carboxylic acid
- AHFS/Drugs.com: International Drug Names
- Routes of administration: By mouth
- ATC code: J01MA10 (WHO)

Legal status
- Legal status: In general: ℞ (Prescription only)

Identifiers
- IUPAC name: 9-Fluoro-10-(4-methylpiperazin-1-yl)-7-oxo-2,3-dihydro-7H-[1,4]thiazino[2,3,4-ij]quinoline-6-carboxylic acid
- CAS Number: 101363-10-4 106017-08-7
- PubChem CID: 58258
- ChemSpider: 52489
- UNII: Y521XM2900
- ChEMBL: ChEMBL295619
- CompTox Dashboard (EPA): DTXSID6048412

Chemical and physical data
- Formula: C_{17}H_{18}FN_{3}O_{3}S
- Molar mass: 363.41 g·mol^{−1}
- 3D model (JSmol): Interactive image
- SMILES: CN1CCN(CC1)C2=C(C=C3C4=C2SCCN4C=C(C3=O)C(=O)O)F
- InChI: InChI=1S/C17H18FN3O3S/c1-19-2-4-20(5-3-19)14-12(18)8-10-13-16(14)25-7-6-21(13)9-11(15(10)22)17(23)24/h8-9H,2-7H2,1H3,(H,23,24); Key:NJCJBUHJQLFDSW-UHFFFAOYSA-N

Rufloxacin is a quinolone antibiotic. It is sold under the brand names, Ruflox, Monos, Qari, Tebraxin, Uroflox, Uroclar.

== See also ==
- Quinolone antibiotic
