= Pipemidic acid =

Chemical compound

Clinical data
- AHFS/Drugs.com: International Drug Names
- ATC code: J01MB04 (WHO)

Identifiers
- IUPAC name: 8-Ethyl-5-oxo-2-piperazin-1-yl-5,8-dihydropyrido[2,3-d]pyrimidine-6-carboxylic acid
- CAS Number: 51940-44-4
- PubChem CID: 4831
- ChemSpider: 4665
- UNII: LT12J5HVR8
- KEGG: D08379
- ChEBI: CHEBI:75250
- ChEMBL: ChEMBL30116
- CompTox Dashboard (EPA): DTXSID3023479
- ECHA InfoCard: 100.052.283

Chemical and physical data
- Formula: C_{14}H_{17}N_{5}O_{3}
- Molar mass: 303.322 g·mol^{−1}
- 3D model (JSmol): Interactive image
- SMILES: CCN1C=C(C(=O)C2=CN=C(N=C21)N3CCNCC3)C(=O)O
- InChI: InChI=1S/C14H17N5O3/c1-2-18-8-10(13(21)22)11(20)9-7-16-14(17-12(9)18)19-5-3-15-4-6-19/h7-8,15H,2-6H2,1H3,(H,21,22); Key:JOHZPMXAZQZXHR-UHFFFAOYSA-N

Pipemidic acid is a member of the pyridopyrimidine class of antibacterials, which display some overlap in mechanism of action with analogous pyridone-containing quinolones. It was introduced in 1979 and is active against gram negative and some gram positive bacteria. It was used for gastrointestinal, biliary, and urinary infections. The marketing authorization of pipemidic acid has been suspended throughout the EU.
