= Fleroxacin =

Chemical compound

Clinical data
- AHFS/Drugs.com: International Drug Names
- ATC code: J01MA08 (WHO)

Identifiers
- IUPAC name: 6,8-Difluoro-1-(2-fluoroethyl)-7-(4-methylpiperazin-1-yl)-4-oxoquinoline-3-carboxylic acid
- CAS Number: 79660-72-3
- PubChem CID: 3357
- DrugBank: DB04576
- ChemSpider: 3240
- UNII: N804LDH51K
- KEGG: D01716
- ChEMBL: ChEMBL6273
- CompTox Dashboard (EPA): DTXSID1046714
- ECHA InfoCard: 100.202.650

Chemical and physical data
- Formula: C_{17}H_{18}F_{3}N_{3}O_{3}
- Molar mass: 369.344 g·mol^{−1}
- 3D model (JSmol): Interactive image
- SMILES: CN1CCN(CC1)C2=C(C=C3C(=C2F)N(C=C(C3=O)C(=O)O)CCF)F
- InChI: InChI=1S/C17H18F3N3O3/c1-21-4-6-22(7-5-21)15-12(19)8-10-14(13(15)20)23(3-2-18)9-11(16(10)24)17(25)26/h8-9H,2-7H2,1H3,(H,25,26); Key:XBJBPGROQZJDOJ-UHFFFAOYSA-N

Fleroxacin is a fluoroquinolone antibiotic. It is sold under the brand names Quinodis and Megalocin.

== Mechanism of action ==
Fleroxacin is a bactericidal drug that inhibits bacterial DNA gyrase and topoisomerase IV. Like other quinolones and fluoroquinolones the compound eradicates bacteria by interfering with DNA replication (bacterial DNA replication, transcription, repair and recombination). Fleroxacin is active against many Gram-positive and Gram-negative bacteria. It is especially active against Shigella species., Salmonella sp., Escherichia coli, Moraxella catarrhalis, Haemophilus influenzae, Neisseria gonorrhoeae, Yersinia enterocolitica, Serratia marcescens, Staphylococcus aureus, Pseudomonas aeruginosa.

== Pharmacokinetics ==
After oral administration fleroxacin is rapidly and well absorbed from the gastrointestinal tract and shows a good bioavailability. The antibiotic is widely distributed throughout the body and in the different biological tissues. In many biologic specimens the levels of fleroxacin are similar to those in plasma, but in bile, nasal secretions, seminal fluid, lung, bronchial mucosa, and ovaries, the drug concentrations are 2-3 times higher than those in plasma. The serum elimination half-life, in subjects with normal renal function, is relatively long (9–12 hours), which permits once-daily dosing. Approximately the urinary excretion is 38% of an orally administered dose within 48 h, and in urine is possible detect 8.6% of the N-demethyl metabolite and 4.4% of the N-oxide metabolite. Fleroxacin can penetrate into milk of nursing women. As quinolones are known to induce arthropathy in juvenile animals, administration of the drug to breast-feeding women cannot be allowed.

== Medical uses ==
Fleroxacin is effective in the treatment of a wide variety of infections, particularly uncomplicated cystitis in women, acute uncomplicated pyelonephritis, gonorrhea, bacterial enteritis, traveler's diarrhea, respiratory tract infections ( including exacerbation of chronic bronchitis).

== Adverse effects ==
In treated patients the most common adverse reactions are gastrointestinal, including dyspepsia, nausea, vomiting, flatulence, abdominal pain, diarrhea and sometimes constipation. Also common disorders affecting the skin (itching, urticaria, rash, phototoxicity and photosensitivity) and central nervous system (dizziness, headache, tremor, paresthesia, impaired sense of taste and smell), psychiatric disorders (alteration of the sleep-wake cycle state of anxiety, depression, hallucinations and nightmares). Fleroxacin and other fluoroquinolones, are known to trigger seizures or lower the seizure threshold, due to their inhibitory activity on GABA receptor binding. The antibiotic should not be administered to patients with epilepsy or a personal history of previous convulsive attacks as may promote the onset of these disorders.

== Contraindications ==
Fleroxacin is contraindicated in patients with a history of hypersensitivity to the substance or any other member of the quinolone class, or any component of the medicine. Fleroxacin, like other fluoroquinolones, can cause degenerative changes in weightbearing joints of young animals. The antibiotic should only be used in children when the expected benefits are outweigh the risks.
