= Flumequine =

Chemical compound

Clinical data
- Other names: 9-Fluoro-6,7-dihydro-5-methyl-1-oxo-1H,5H-benzo[ij]-quinolizine-2-carboxylic acid
- AHFS/Drugs.com: International Drug Names
- ATC code: J01MB07 (WHO)

Legal status
- Legal status: withdrawn

Pharmacokinetic data
- Excretion: urine and feces

Identifiers
- IUPAC name: 7-fluoro-12-methyl-4-oxo-1-azatricyclo[7.3.1.0^{5,13}]trideca-2,5,7,9(13)-tetraene-3-carboxylic acid
- CAS Number: 42835-25-6
- PubChem CID: 3374
- DrugBank: DB08972
- ChemSpider: 3257
- UNII: UVG8VSP2SJ
- KEGG: D02302
- ChEBI: CHEBI:85267
- CompTox Dashboard (EPA): DTXSID5045623
- ECHA InfoCard: 100.050.857

Chemical and physical data
- Formula: C_{14}H_{12}FNO_{3}
- Molar mass: 261.252 g·mol^{−1}
- 3D model (JSmol): Interactive image
- Melting point: 253 to 255 °C (487 to 491 °F)
- SMILES: Fc2cc1C(=O)/C(C(=O)O)=C\N3c1c(c2)CCC3C
- InChI: InChI=1S/C14H12FNO3/c1-7-2-3-8-4-9(15)5-10-12(8)16(7)6-11(13(10)17)14(18)19/h4-7H,2-3H2,1H3,(H,18,19); Key:DPSPPJIUMHPXMA-UHFFFAOYSA-N

Flumequine is a synthetic fluoroquinolone antibiotic used to treat bacterial infections. It is a first-generation fluoroquinolone antibacterial that has been removed from clinical use and is no longer being marketed. The marketing authorization of flumequine has been suspended throughout the EU. It kills bacteria by interfering with the enzymes that cause DNA to unwind and duplicate. Flumequine was used in veterinarian medicine for the treatment of enteric infections (all infections of the intestinal tract), as well as to treat cattle, swine, chickens, and fish, but only in a limited number of countries. It was occasionally used in France (and a few other European Countries) to treat urinary tract infections under the trade name Apurone. However this was a limited indication because only minimal serum levels were achieved.

== History ==
The first quinolone used was nalidixic acid (was marketed in many countries as Negram) followed by the fluoroquinolone flumequine. The first-generation fluoroquinolone agents, such as flumequine, had poor distribution into the body tissues and limited activity. As such they were used mainly for treatment of urinary tract infections. Flumequine (benzo quinolizine) was first patented in 1973, (German Patent) by Rikker Labs. Flumequine is a known antimicrobial compound described and claimed in U.S. Pat. No. 3,896,131 (Example 3), July 22, 1975. Flumequine is the first quinolone compound with a fluorine atom at the C6-position of the related quinolone basic molecular structure. Even though this was the first fluoroquinolone, it is often overlooked when classifying the drugs within this class by generations and excluded from such a list.

Though used frequently to treat farm animals and on occasion household pets, flumequine was also used to treat urinary tract infections in humans. Flumequine, was used transiently treat urinary infections until ocular toxicity was reported. as well as liver damage and anaphylactic shock.

In 2008, the United States Food and Drug Administration (FDA) requested that all quinolone/fluoroquinolone drugs package inserts include a Black Boxed Warning concerning the risk of spontaneous tendon ruptures, which would have included flumequine. The FDA also requested that the manufacturers send out Dear Doctor Letters regarding this new warning. Such tendon problems have also been associated with flumequine.

== Drug residue ==
The use of flumequine in food animals had sparked considerable debate. Significant and harmful residues of quinolones have been found in animals treated with quinolones and later slaughtered and sold as food products. There has been significant concern regarding the amount of flumequine residue found within food animals such as fish, poultry and cattle. In 2003 the Joint FAO/WHO Committee on Food Additives (JECFA) withdrew the maximum residue limits (MRLs) for flumequine and carbadox based on evidence showing both are direct acting genotoxic carcinogens, therefore the Committee was unable to establish an Acceptable Daily Intake (ADI) for human exposure to such residues. Subsequently, in 2006, the JEFCA, re-established the ADI having received appropriate evidence and MRLs were re-specified. The role of JECFA is to evaluate toxicology, residue chemistry and related information and make recommendations for acceptable daily intake (ADI) levels and maximum residue limits (MRLs). At its 16th session, held May 2006, the Committee on Residues of Veterinary Drugs in Foods (CCRVDF) requested information on registered uses of flumequine. As the CCRVDF did not receive any information regarding the registered uses of flumequine that they had requested, the committee members agreed to discontinue work on the MRLs for flumequine in shrimp.

== Licensed uses ==
Urinary tract infections (veterinary and human)

== Availability ==
Veterinary use:

- Solution; Oral; 20% (prescription only)
- Solution; Oral; 10% (prescription only)

Human use:

- Tablet; Oral; Flumequine 400 mg (discontinued)

== Mode of action ==
Flumequine is a member of the quinolone antibiotics family, which are active against both Gram-positive and Gram-negative bacteria. It functions by inhibiting DNA gyrase, a type II topoisomerase, and topoisomerase IV, enzymes necessary to separate bacterial DNA, thereby inhibiting cell division.

This mechanism can also affect mammalian cell replication. In particular, some congeners of this drug family (for example those that contain the C-8 fluorine), display high activity not only against bacterial topoisomerases, but also against eukaryotic topoisomerases and are toxic to cultured mammalian cells and in vivo tumor models.

Although quinolones are highly toxic to mammalian cells in culture, its mechanism of cytotoxic action is not known. Quinolone induced DNA damage was first reported in 1986 (Hussy et al.).

Recent studies have demonstrated a correlation between mammalian cell cytotoxicity of the quinolones and the induction of micronuclei.

As such, some fluoroquinolones may cause injury to the chromosome of eukaryotic cells.

There continues to be considerable debate as to whether or not this DNA damage is to be considered one of the mechanisms of action concerning the severe adverse reactions experienced by some patients following fluoroquinolone therapy.

== Adverse reactions ==
Flumequine was associated with severe ocular toxicity, which precluded its use in human patients. Drug-induced calculi (kidney stones) has been associated with such therapy as well. Anaphylactic shock induced by flumequine therapy has also been associated with its use. Anaphylactoid reactions such as shock, urticaria, and Quincke’s oedema have been reported to generally appear within two hours after taking the first tablet. There were eighteen reports listed within the WHO file in 1996. As with all drugs within this class, flumequine therapy may result in severe central nervous system (CNS) reactions, phototoxicity resulting in skin reactions like erythema, pruritus, urticaria and severe rashes, gastrointestinal and neurological disorders.

== Drug interactions ==
Flumequine was found to have no effect on theophylline pharmacokinetics.

== Chemistry ==
Flumequine is a 9-fluoro-6,7-dihydro-5-methyl-1-oxo-1H,5H-benzo[ij]quinolizine-2-carboxylic acid. The molecular formula is C_{14}H_{12}FNO_{3}. It is a white powder, odorless, flavorless, insoluble in water but soluble in organic solvent.

== Pharmacokinetics ==
Flumequine is considered to be well absorbed and is excreted in the urine and feces as the glucuronide conjugates of the parent drug and 7-hydroxyflumequine. It is eliminated within 168 hours post-dosing. However, studies concerning the calf liver showed additional unidentified residues, of which a new metabolite, ml, represented the major single metabolite 24 hours after the last dose and at all subsequent time points. The metabolite ml, which exhibited no antimicrobial activity, was present in both free and protein-bound fractions. The major residue found in the edible tissues of sheep, pigs, and chickens was parent drug together with minor amounts of the 7-hydroxy-metabolite. The only detected residue in trout was the parent drug.

== See also ==
- Adverse effects of fluoroquinolones
