= Marbofloxacin =

Chemical compound

Clinical data
- Trade names: XeniQuin bolus & Injection (Opsonin Agrovet BD)
- AHFS/Drugs.com: International Drug Names
- Routes of administration: By mouth
- ATCvet code: QJ01MA93 (WHO)

Legal status
- Legal status: US: ℞-only

Identifiers
- IUPAC name: 9-fluoro-2,3-dihydro-3-methyl-10-(4-methyl-1-piperazinyl)-7-oxo-7H-pyridol(3,2,1-ij)(4,2,1)benzoxadiazin-6 carboxylic acid
- CAS Number: 115550-35-1
- ChemSpider: 54663
- UNII: 8X09WU898T
- ChEMBL: ChEMBL478120
- CompTox Dashboard (EPA): DTXSID4046600
- ECHA InfoCard: 100.168.181

Chemical and physical data
- Formula: C_{17}H_{19}FN_{4}O_{4}
- Molar mass: 362.361 g·mol^{−1}
- 3D model (JSmol): Interactive image
- SMILES: Fc4cc1c2N(/C=C(\C1=O)C(=O)O)N(COc2c4N3CCN(C)CC3)C
- InChI: InChI=1S/C17H19FN4O4/c1-19-3-5-21(6-4-19)14-12(18)7-10-13-16(14)26-9-20(2)22(13)8-11(15(10)23)17(24)25/h7-8H,3-6,9H2,1-2H3,(H,24,25); Key:BPFYOAJNDMUVBL-UHFFFAOYSA-N

Marbofloxacin is a carboxylic acid derivative third generation fluoroquinolone antibiotic. It is used in veterinary medicine under the brand names Marbocyl, Forcyl, Marbo vet and Zeniquin. A formulation of marbofloxacin combined with clotrimazole and dexamethasone is available under the name Aurizon (CAS number 115550-35-1).

== Mechanism of action ==
Its mechanism of action is not thoroughly understood, but it is believed to be similar to the other fluoroquinolones by impairing the bacterial DNA gyrase which results in rapid bactericidal activity. The other proposed mechanisms include that it acts against nondividing bacteria and does not require protein and RNA synthesis, which block protein and RNA synthesis respectively.

== Activity ==
Marbofloxacin is a synthetic, broad spectrum bactericidal agent. The bactericidal activity of marbofloxacin is concentration dependent, with susceptible bacteria cell death occurring within 20–30 minutes of exposure. Like other fluoroquinolones, marbofloxacin has demonstrated a significant post-antibiotic effect for both gram– and + bacteria and is active in both stationary and growth phases of bacterial replication.

It has good activity against many gram-negative bacilli and cocci, is effective against:

- Aeromonas
- Brucella
- Campylobacter
- Chlamydia trachomatis
- Enterobacter
- Escherichia coli
- Haemophilus
- Klebsiella spp
- Mycobacterium
- Mycoplasma
- Proteus
- Pseudomonas aeruginosa
- Salmonella
- Serratia
- Shigella
- Staphylococci (including penicillinase-producing and methicillin-resistant strains)
- Vibrio
- Yersinia

== Application ==
Marbofloxacin can be used both orally and topically. It is particularly used for infections of the skin, respiratory system and mammary glands in dogs and cats, as well as with urinary tract infections. For dogs, a dose ranges from 2.75 - 5.5 mg/kg once a day. The duration of treatment is usually at least five days, longer if there is a concurrent fungal or yeast infection. Maximum duration of treatment is 30 days.

== Contraindications and side effects ==
Marbofloxacin should usually be avoided in young animals because of potential cartilage abnormalities. In rare occasion, it can cause central nervous system (CNS) stimulation and should be used with caution in patients with seizure disorders. Under certain conditions it can cause discomfort such as cramps, treatable with diazepam. Other adverse effects are usually limited to gastrointestinal tract (GI) distress (vomiting, anorexia, soft stools, diarrhoea) and decreased activity.
