= Gemifloxacin =

Medication to treat chronic bronchitis

Clinical data
- Trade names: Factive
- AHFS/Drugs.com: Monograph
- MedlinePlus: a604014
- License data: US DailyMed: Gemifloxacin
- Routes of administration: By mouth
- ATC code: J01MA15 (WHO)

Legal status
- Legal status: US: ℞-only; In general: ℞ (Prescription only)

Pharmacokinetic data
- Bioavailability: 71%
- Protein binding: 60–70%
- Metabolism: Limited metabolism by the liver to minor metabolites
- Excretion: Feces (61%); urine (36%)

Identifiers
- IUPAC name: 7-[(4Z)-3-(Aminomethyl)-4-methoxyimino-pyrrolidin-1-yl]-1-cyclopropyl-6-fluoro-4-oxo- 1,8-naphthyridine-3-carboxylic acid
- CAS Number: 175463-14-6
- PubChem CID: 9571107
- DrugBank: DB01155
- ChemSpider: 7845573
- UNII: OKR68Y0E4T
- KEGG: D08012
- ChEBI: CHEBI:101853
- ChEMBL: ChEMBL430
- CompTox Dashboard (EPA): DTXSID3048495

Chemical and physical data
- Formula: C_{18}H_{20}FN_{5}O_{4}
- Molar mass: 389.387 g·mol^{−1}
- 3D model (JSmol): Interactive image
- SMILES: Fc2c(nc1N(/C=C(/C(=O)O)C(=O)c1c2)C3CC3)N4C/C(=N\OC)C(C4)CN
- InChI: InChI=1S/C18H20FN5O4/c1-28-22-14-8-23(6-9(14)5-20)17-13(19)4-11-15(25)12(18(26)27)7-24(10-2-3-10)16(11)21-17/h4,7,9-10H,2-3,5-6,8,20H2,1H3,(H,26,27)/b22-14+; Key:ZRCVYEYHRGVLOC-HYARGMPZSA-N

Gemifloxacin mesylate, sold under the brand name Factive among others, is a broad-spectrum quinolone antibacterial agent used in the treatment of acute bacterial exacerbation of chronic bronchitis and mild-to-moderate pneumonia. It is taken by mouth. Vansen Pharma Inc. licensed the active ingredient from LG Life Sciences of Korea.

== Common Uses (Indications) ==
Gemifloxacin is indicated for the treatment of infections caused by susceptible strains of the designated microorganisms in the conditions listed below.

- Acute bacterial exacerbation of chronic bronchitis caused by S. pneumoniae, Haemophilus influenzae, Haemophilus parainfluenzae, or Moraxella catarrhalis
- Community-acquired pneumonia (of mild to moderate severity) caused by S. pneumoniae (including multi-drug resistant strains, Haemophilus influenzae, Moraxella catarrhalis, Mycoplasma pneumoniae, Chlamydia pneumoniae, or Klebsiella pneumoniae

== Microbiology ==
Gemifloxacin has been shown to be active against most strains of the following microorganisms:

Aerobic gram-positive microorganisms – Streptococcus pneumoniae

including multi-drug resistant Streptococcus pneumoniae (MDRSP). MDRSP includes isolates previously known as PRSP (penicillin-resistant Streptococcus pneumoniae), and are strains resistant to two or more of the following antibiotics: penicillin, 2nd generation cephalosporins, e.g., cefuroxime, macrolides, tetracyclines and trimethoprim/sulfamethoxazole.

Staphylococcus aureus and Streptococcus pyogenes

Aerobic gram-negative microorganisms – Haemophilus influenzae, Haemophilus parainfluenzae, Klebsiella pneumoniae (many strains are moderately susceptible), Moraxella catarrhalis, Acinetobacter lwoffii, Klebsiella oxytoca, Legionella pneumophila, Proteus vulgaris.
Other microorganisms – Chlamydia pneumoniae, Mycoplasma pneumoniae

== Adverse effects ==
Fluoroquinolones are generally well tolerated with most side effects being mild and serious adverse effects being rarely. Some of the serious adverse effects which occur more commonly with fluoroquinolones than with other antibiotic drug classes include CNS and tendon toxicity. The currently marketed quinolones have safety profiles similar to that of other antimicrobial classes.

The serious events may occur with therapeutic or with acute overdose. At therapeutic doses they include: central nervous system toxicity, cardiovascular toxicity, tendon / articular toxicity, and rarely hepatic toxicity. Events that may occur in acute overdose are rare and include: renal failure and seizure. Children and the elderly are at greater risk. Tendon damage may manifest during, as well as up to a year after fluoroquinolone therapy.

The FDA added a boxed warnings on all fluoroquinolones about the possible toxic effects of fluoroquinolones on tendons.

In August 2013, the FDA issued a Safety Announcement where they described that they are requiring the medication guides and drug labels for all fluoroquinolones to be updated and better describe the risk for peripheral neuropathy. The peripheral neuropathy may occur very quickly, and may be irreversible. This warning applies to fluoroquinolones taken by mouth and injection, but does not apply to fluoroquinolones taken topically.

== Research ==
A study showed that gemifloxacin possess anti-metastatic activities against breast cancer in vitro and in vivo (in mice).
