= Pradofloxacin =

Antibacterial agent

Clinical data
- Trade names: Veraflox, Pradalex
- License data: US DailyMed: Pradofloxacin
- Routes of administration: By mouth, intramuscular, subcutaneous
- ATCvet code: QJ01MA97 (WHO)

Legal status
- Legal status: CA: ℞-only; US: ℞-only; EU: Rx-only

Identifiers
- IUPAC name: 7-[(1S),(6S)-2,8-diazabicyclo[4.3.0]nonan-8-yl]-8-cyano-1-cyclopropyl-6-fluoro-4-oxo-1,4-dihydroquinoline-3-carboxylic acid
- CAS Number: 195532-12-8
- PubChem CID: 9802884
- ChemSpider: 7978646
- UNII: 6O0T5E048I
- CompTox Dashboard (EPA): DTXSID60173229
- ECHA InfoCard: 100.169.611

Chemical and physical data
- Formula: C_{21}H_{21}FN_{4}O_{3}
- Molar mass: 396.422 g·mol^{−1}
- 3D model (JSmol): Interactive image
- SMILES: N#Cc1c(N2C[C@@H]3CCCN[C@@H]3C2)c(F)cc2c(=O)c(C(=O)O)cn(C3CC3)c12
- InChI: InChI=1S/C21H21FN4O3/c22-16-6-13-18(26(12-3-4-12)9-15(20(13)27)21(28)29)14(7-23)19(16)25-8-11-2-1-5-24-17(11)10-25/h6,9,11-12,17,24H,1-5,8,10H2,(H,28,29)/t11-,17+/m0/s1; Key:LZLXHGFNOWILIY-APPDUMDISA-N

Pradofloxacin, sold under the brand name Veraflox among others, is a third-generation enhanced spectrum veterinary antibiotic of the fluoroquinolone class. It was developed by Elanco Animal Health GmbH and received approval from the European Commission in April 2011, for prescription-only use in veterinary medicine for the treatment of bacterial infections in dogs and cats.

== Medical uses ==
=== Dogs ===
In the European Union, pradofloxacin is indicated for the treatment of:

- wound infections and superficial and deep pyoderma caused by susceptible strains of the Staphylococcus intermedius group (including S. pseudintermedius),
- acute urinary tract infections caused by susceptible strains of Escherichia coli and the Staphylococcus intermedius group (including S. pseudintermedius) and
- as adjunctive treatment to mechanical or surgical periodontal therapy in the treatment of severe infections of the gingiva and periodontal tissues caused by susceptible strains of anaerobic organisms, for example Porphyromonas spp. and Prevotella spp.

=== Cats ===
In the European Union, pradofloxacin is indicated for the treatment of:

- acute infections of the upper respiratory tract caused by susceptible strains of Pasteurella multocida, Escherichia coli and the Staphylococcus intermedius group (including S. pseudintermedius).
- wound infections and abscesses caused by susceptible strains of Pasteurella multocida and the Staphylococcus intermedius group (including S. pseudintermedius) [for oral suspension only].

=== Cattle and swine ===
In the United States, pradofloxacin is indicated for certain respiratory diseases in cattle and swine. It is approved for certain ages and classes of cattle for the treatment of bovine respiratory disease (BRD) associated with Mannheimia haemolytica, Pasteurella multocida, Histophilus somni, and Mycoplasma bovis. It may only be prescribed for cattle intended for slaughter and cattle intended for breeding that are less than one year of age; it is not for use in cattle intended for breeding one year of age and older, beef calves less than two months of age, dairy calves, and veal calves. It is approved for use in swine for the treatment of swine respiratory disease (SRD) associated with Bordetella bronchiseptica, Glaesserella (Haemophilus) parasuis, Pasteurella multocida, Streptococcus suis, and Mycoplasma hyopneumoniae. It may only be prescribed for weaned swine intended for slaughter; it is not for use in swine intended for breeding or nursing piglets.

== Mechanism of action ==
The primary mode of action of fluoroquinolones involves interaction with enzymes essential for major DNA functions such as replication, transcription and recombination. The primary targets for pradofloxacin are the bacterial DNA gyrase and topoisomerase IV enzymes. Reversible association between pradofloxacin and DNA gyrase or DNA topoisomerase IV in the target bacteria results in inhibition of these enzymes and rapid death of the bacterial cell. The rapidity and extent of bacterial killing are directly proportional to the drug concentration.

As a result, pradofloxacin is active against a wide range of Gram-positive and Gram-negative bacteria including anaerobic bacteria.

== History ==
Pradofloxacin was first discovered by chemists at Bayer in 1994 and patented in 1998. The name pradofloxacin was issued in December 2000 by the World Health Organization. Following submission for marketing authorisation to the European Medicines Agency (EMA) in 2004, the application was refused in 2006, prompting further studies.

Having reviewed the additional studies, the EMA Committee for Medicinal Products for Veterinary Use (CVMP) recommended granting marketing authorisation of pradofloxacin by consensus in February 2011. Marketing authorisation of pradofloxacin was granted by the European Commission in April 2011.
