= Pyridopyrimidine =

Organic chemical compound

Chemical structure of pyrido[3,2-d]pyrimidine, one of the isomers of pyridopyrimidine

Pyridopyrimidine is an organic hetero bicyclic chemical compound consisting of pyridine ring fused orthogonally at any position to a pyrimidine ring.

== See also ==
- List of pyridopyrimidines
