= Oxolinic acid =

Chemical compound

Clinical data
- AHFS/Drugs.com: International Drug Names
- ATC code: J01MB05 (WHO)

Identifiers
- IUPAC name: 5-Ethyl-8-oxo-5,8-dihydro[1,3]dioxolo[4,5-g]quinoline- 7-carboxylic acid
- CAS Number: 14698-29-4
- PubChem CID: 4628
- ChemSpider: 4467
- UNII: L0A22B22FT
- KEGG: D02301
- ChEBI: CHEBI:138856
- ChEMBL: ChEMBL416755
- CompTox Dashboard (EPA): DTXSID1021089
- ECHA InfoCard: 100.035.213

Chemical and physical data
- Formula: C_{13}H_{11}NO_{5}
- Molar mass: 261.233 g·mol^{−1}
- 3D model (JSmol): Interactive image
- SMILES: CCN1C=C(C(=O)C2=CC3=C(C=C21)OCO3)C(=O)O
- InChI: InChI=1S/C13H11NO5/c1-2-14-5-8(13(16)17)12(15)7-3-10-11(4-9(7)14)19-6-18-10/h3-5H,2,6H2,1H3,(H,16,17); Key:KYGZCKSPAKDVKC-UHFFFAOYSA-N

Oxolinic acid is a quinolone antibiotic developed in Japan in the 1970s. Dosages 12–20 mg/kg orally administered for five to ten days. The antibiotic works by inhibiting the enzyme DNA gyrase. It also acts as a dopamine reuptake inhibitor and has stimulant effects in mice.

== See also ==
- Amfonelic acid
- Fluoroquinolone
