= Quinolone antibiotic =

Class of antibacterial drugs, subgroup of quinolones

Quinolone
- Drug class
- The second generation fluoroquinolone, ciprofloxacin. The two-ringed nitrogen-containing system with a ketone is called a quinolone.

Class identifiers
- Use: Bacterial infection
- ATC code: J01M

Clinical data
- Drugs.com: Drug Classes

External links
- MeSH: D015363

Legal status

Quinolone antibiotics constitute a large group of broad-spectrum bacteriocidals that share a bicyclic core structure related to the substance 4-quinolone. They are used in human and veterinary medicine to treat bacterial infections, as well as in animal husbandry, specifically poultry production.

Quinolone antibiotics are classified into four generations based on their spectrum of activity and chemical modifications. The first-generation quinolones, such as nalidixic acid, primarily target Gram-negative bacteria and are mainly used for urinary tract infections. Second-generation quinolones introduced fluorine atoms into their structure, creating fluoroquinolones, which significantly expanded their antibacterial activity to include some Gram-positive bacteria. Third-generation fluoroquinolones further improved Gram-positive coverage, while fourth-generation fluoroquinolones offer broad-spectrum activity, including anaerobic bacteria.

Only quinolone antibiotics in generation two and higher are considered fluoroquinolones, as they contain a fluorine atom in their chemical structure and are effective against both Gram-negative and Gram-positive bacteria. One example is ciprofloxacin, one of the most widely used antibiotics worldwide.

== Medical uses ==
Levofloxacin

Trovafloxacin

Fluoroquinolones are frequently prescribed for genitourinary tract infections and are widely used in the treatment of hospital-acquired infections associated with urinary catheters. The FDA published a 2018 safety alert recommending FQs be reserved for use only in patients who have no alternative treatment options for the following indications: uncomplicated urinary tract infection, acute bacterial exacerbation of chronic bronchitis, and acute bacterial sinusitis. In community-acquired infections, they are only recommended when risk factors for multidrug resistance are present or after other antibiotic regimens have failed. However, for serious acute cases of pyelonephritis or bacterial prostatitis where the person may need to be hospitalised, fluoroquinolones are recommended as first-line therapy.

Due to people with sickle-cell disease being at increased risk for developing osteomyelitis from Salmonella, fluoroquinolones are the "drugs of choice" for this organism due to their ability to enter bone tissue without chelating it, as tetracyclines are known to do.

In biofilm-associated infections, quinolones exhibit a good ability to penetrate the biofilm and target bacteria within it, especially during the early stages of biofilm formation. Their antibiofilm activity is generally higher than that of old beta-lactams and glycopeptides but remains lower compared to antibiotics such as tetracyclines, daptomycin, and fosfomycin, which demonstrate greater efficacy against biofilms.

Fluoroquinolones are featured prominently in guidelines for the treatment of hospital-acquired pneumonia.

=== Children ===
In most countries, fluoroquinolones are only approved for use in children under narrowly defined circumstances, owing in part to the observation of high rates of musculoskeletal adverse events in fluoroquinolone-treated juvenile animals. The use of fluoroquinolones in those 18 years of age and under is only FDA approved for complicated UTI's (pyelonephritis and for postexposure prophylaxis) and treatment of inhalation anthrax. In the UK, the prescribing indications for fluoroquinolones for children are severely restricted. Only inhalational anthrax and pseudomonal infections in cystic fibrosis infections are licensed indications in the UK due to ongoing safety concerns. In a study comparing the safety and efficacy of levofloxacin to that of azithromycin or ceftriaxone in 712 children with community-acquired pneumonia, serious adverse events were experienced by 6% of those treated with levofloxacin and 4% of those treated with comparator antibiotics. Most of these were considered by the treating physician to be unrelated or doubtfully related to the study drug. Two deaths were observed in the levofloxacin group, neither of which was thought to be treatment-related. Spontaneous reports to the U.S. FDA Adverse Effects Reporting System at the time of the 20 September 2011 U.S. FDA Pediatric Drugs Advisory Committee included musculoskeletal events (39, including five cases of tendon rupture) and central nervous system events (19, including five cases of seizures) as the most common spontaneous reports between April 2005 and March 2008. An estimated 130,000 pediatric prescriptions for levofloxacin were filled on behalf of 112,000 pediatric patients during that period.

Meta-analyses conclude that fluoroquinolones pose little or no additional risk to children compared to other antibiotic classes. Fluoroquinolone use in children may be appropriate when the infection is caused by multidrug-resistant bacteria, or when alternative treatment options require parenteral administration and oral therapy is preferred.

== Adverse effects ==
On May 12, 2016 the U.S. Food and Drug Administration advised that the serious, disabling and potentially permanent side effects associated with fluoroquinolone antibiotics (Cipro, Levaquin, Avelox, etc.) generally outweigh the benefits for patients with acute sinusitis, acute bronchitis, and uncomplicated urinary tract infections. These side effects can involve tendons, muscles, joints, nerves and the central nervous system as well as cardiac, dermatologic and worsening of myasthenia gravis conditions. With fluoroquinolones these effects are sometimes collectively called floxing.

=== Suicide ===
Fluoroquinolones can increase the risk of psychiatric symptoms, including depression and psychotic reactions. These may potentially lead to thoughts of suicide or suicide attempts.

Recent reports from coroners on two suicides show the risks of fluoroquinolones in everyday life. Neither victim had a history of depression or mental health problems. However, both men had been prescribed ciprofloxacin shortly before they killed themselves.

In a "Report to Prevent Future Deaths", mandated by UK law, one of the coroners noted that there is no compelling reason why patients should expect to risk becoming suicidal from an antibiotic unless this fact and potential symptoms were brought to their attention by the prescriber.

A 2024 review from the UK's Medicines & Healthcare Products Regulatory Agency examined the effectiveness of current measures to reduce these identified risks of fluoroquinolones. It concluded, "Systemic fluoroquinolones must now only be prescribed when other commonly recommended antibiotics are inappropriate."

=== Other nervous system side effects ===
Nervous-system effects include insomnia, restlessness, and rarely, seizure, convulsions, and psychosis. Other rare and serious adverse events have been observed with varying degrees of evidence for causation.

=== Chronology of boxed warnings ===
In 2008, the U.S. FDA added black box warnings on all fluoroquinolones, advising of the increased risk of tendon damage. In 2016, the FDA found that systemic use (by mouth or injection) of fluoroquinolones was associated with "disabling and potentially permanent serious side effects" involving the tendons, muscles, joints, nerves, and central nervous system, concluding that these side effects generally outweigh the benefits for people with acute sinusitis, acute bronchitis, and uncomplicated urinary tract infections when other treatment options are available. Concerns regarding low blood sugar and mental health problems were added in 2018. In December 2018, the FDA issued a warning regarding an increased risk of aortic aneurysms and aortic dissections associated with fluoroquinolone use. This warning specifically targeted older adults and patients with conditions such as hypertension, Marfan syndrome, Ehlers–Danlos syndrome, atherosclerosis, peripheral vascular disease, and a history of aneurysms.

=== Tendons ===
Quinolones are associated with a risk of tendonitis and tendon rupture; a 2013 review found the incidence of tendon injury among those taking fluoroquinolones to be between 0.08 and 0.20%. The risk appears to be higher among people older than 60 and those also taking corticosteroids; the risk also may be higher among people who are male, have a pre-existing joint or tendon issue, have kidney disease, or are highly active. Some experts have advised avoidance of fluoroquinolones in athletes. If tendonitis occurs, it generally appears within one month, and the most common tendon injured appears to be the Achilles tendon. The cause is not well understood.

=== Aortic dissection ===
Fluoroquinolones can increase the rate of rare but serious tears in the aorta by 31% compared to other antibiotics. People at increased risk include those with aortic aneurysm, hypertension, certain genetic conditions such as Marfan syndrome and Ehlers–Danlos syndrome, and the elderly. For these people, fluoroquinolones should be used only when no other treatment options are available. One year after the warning announcement, prescribing behaviors were reported to have remained unchanged.

=== Colitis ===
Clostridioides difficile colitis may occur in connection with the use of any antibacterial drug, especially those with a broad spectrum of activity such as clindamycin, cephalosporins, and fluoroquinolones. Fluoroquinoline treatment is associated with risk that is similar to or less than that associated with broad spectrum cephalosporins. Fluoroquinolone administration may be associated with the acquisition and outgrowth of a particularly virulent Clostridium strain.

=== Other ===
More generally, fluoroquinolones are tolerated, with typical drug side effects being mild to moderate. Common side effects include gastrointestinal effects such as nausea, vomiting, and diarrhea, as well as headache and insomnia. Postmarketing surveillance has revealed a variety of relatively rare but serious adverse effects associated with all members of the fluoroquinolone antibacterial class. Among these, tendon problems and exacerbation of the symptoms of the neurological disorder myasthenia gravis are the subject of "black box" warnings in the United States.

A 2018 EU-wide review of fluoroquinolones concluded that they are associated with serious side effects including tendonitis, tendon rupture, arthralgia, pain in extremities, gait disturbance, neuropathies associated with paraesthesia, depression, fatigue, memory impairment, sleep disorders, and impaired hearing, vision, taste and smell. Tendon damage (especially to Achilles tendon but also other tendons) can occur within 48 hours of starting fluoroquinolone treatment but the damage may be delayed several months after stopping treatment.

The overall rate of adverse events in people treated with fluoroquinolones is roughly similar to that seen in people treated with other antibiotic classes. A U.S. Centers for Disease Control and Prevention study found people treated with fluoroquinolones experienced adverse events severe enough to lead to an emergency department visit more frequently than those treated with cephalosporins or macrolides, but less frequently than those treated with penicillins, clindamycin, sulfonamides, or vancomycin.

Fluoroquinolones prolong the heart's QT interval by blocking voltage-gated potassium channels. Prolongation of the QT interval can lead to torsades de pointes, a life-threatening arrhythmia, but in practice, this appears relatively uncommon in part because the most widely prescribed fluoroquinolones (ciprofloxacin and levofloxacin) only minimally prolong the QT interval.

In 2019 study by Journal of the American College of Cardiology it was discovered that fluoroquinolones could increase the risk for heart valve diseases.

Events that may occur in acute overdose are rare, and include kidney failure and seizure. Susceptible groups of patients, such as children and the elderly, are at greater risk of adverse reactions during therapeutic use.

=== Mechanism of toxicity ===
The mechanisms of the toxicity of fluoroquinolones have been attributed to their interactions with different receptor complexes, such as blockade of the GABA_{A} receptor complex within the central nervous system, leading to excitotoxic type effects and oxidative stress.

== Interactions ==
Products containing multivalent cations, such as aluminium- or magnesium-containing antacids, and products containing calcium, iron, or zinc invariably result in marked reduction of oral absorption of fluoroquinolones. Other drugs that interact with fluoroquinolones include sucralfate, probenecid, cimetidine, theophylline, warfarin, antiviral agents, phenytoin, cyclosporine, rifampin, pyrazinamide, and cycloserine.

Administration of quinolone antibiotics to a benzodiazepine-dependent individual can precipitate acute benzodiazepine withdrawal symptoms due to quinolones displacing benzodiazepines from their binding sites. Fluoroquinolones have varying specificity for cytochrome P450, so may have interactions with drugs cleared by those enzymes; the order from most P450-inhibitory to least, is enoxacin > ciprofloxacin > norfloxacin > ofloxacin, levofloxacin, trovafloxacin, gatifloxacin, moxifloxacin.

== Contraindications ==
Quinolones are not recommended in people with epilepsy, Marfan's syndrome, Ehlers–Danlos syndrome, QT prolongation, pre-existing CNS lesions, or CNS inflammation, or who have had a stroke. They are best avoided in the athlete population. Safety concerns exist for fluoroquinolone use during pregnancy, so they are contraindicated unless no other safe alternative antibiotic exists. However, one meta-analysis looking at the outcome of pregnancies involving quinolone use in the first trimester found no increased risk of malformations. They are also contraindicated in children due to the risks of damage to the musculoskeletal system. Their use in children is not absolutely contraindicated, however for certain severe infections where other antibiotics are not an option, their use can be justified. Quinolones should also not be given to people with a known hypersensitivity to the drug class.

The basic pharmacophore, or active structure, of the fluoroquinolone class is based upon the quinoline ring system. The addition of the fluorine atom at C6 distinguishes the successive-generation fluoroquinolones from the first-generation of quinolones. The addition of the C6 fluorine atom has since been demonstrated not to be required for the antibacterial activity of this class (circa 1997).

== Antibiotic misuse and bacterial resistances ==
Because the use of broad-spectrum antibiotics encourages the spread of multidrug-resistant strains and the development of Clostridioides difficile infections, treatment guidelines often recommend minimizing the use of fluoroquinolones and other broad-spectrum antibiotics in less severe infections and in those in which risk factors for multidrug resistance are not present. It has been recommended that fluoroquinolones not be used as a first-line agent for community-acquired pneumonia, instead recommending macrolide or doxycycline as first-line agents. The Drug-Resistant Streptococcus pneumoniae Working Group recommends fluoroquinolones be used for the ambulatory treatment of community-acquired pneumonia only after other antibiotic classes have been tried and failed, or in cases with demonstrated drug-resistant Streptococcus pneumoniae.

Resistance to quinolones can evolve rapidly, even during a course of treatment. Numerous pathogens, including Escherichia coli, commonly exhibit resistance. Widespread veterinary usage of quinolones, in particular in Europe, has been implicated.

Fluoroquinolones had become the class of antibiotics most commonly prescribed to adults in 2002. Nearly half (42%) of these prescriptions were for conditions not approved by the U.S. FDA, such as acute bronchitis, otitis media, and acute upper respiratory tract infection, according to a study supported in part by the Agency for Healthcare Research and Quality. In addition, they are commonly prescribed for medical conditions, such as acute respiratory illness, that are usually caused by viral infections.

Three mechanisms of resistance are known. Some types of efflux pumps can act to decrease intracellular quinolone concentration. In gram-negative bacteria, plasmid-mediated resistance genes produce proteins that can bind to DNA gyrase, protecting it from the action of quinolones. Finally, mutations at key sites in DNA gyrase or topoisomerase IV can decrease their binding affinity to quinolones, decreasing the drugs' effectiveness.

== Mechanism of action ==
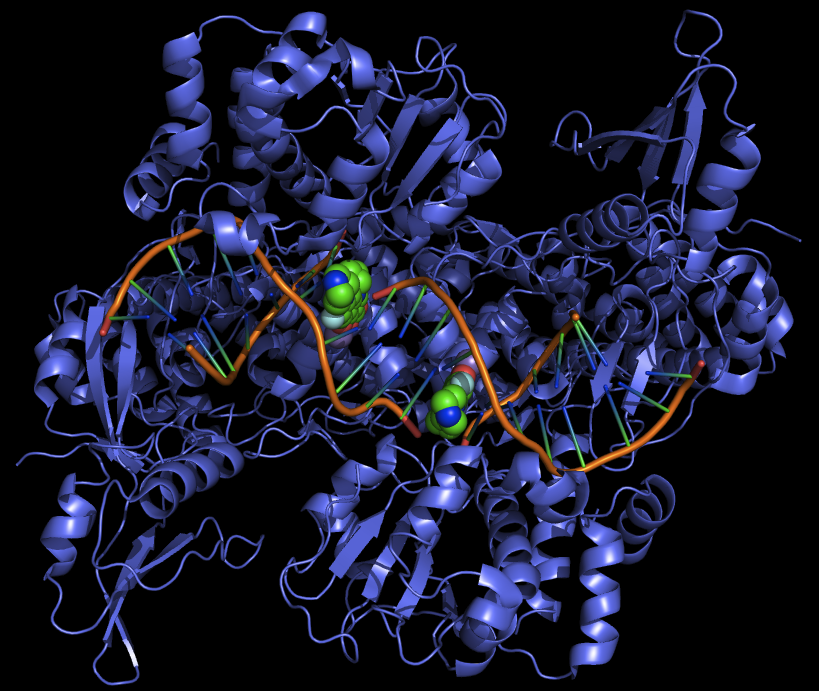
Structure of bacterial DNA gyrase complexed with DNA and two ciprofloxacin molecules (green)

Quinolones are chemotherapeutic bactericidal drugs. They interfere with DNA replication by preventing bacterial DNA from unwinding and duplicating. Specifically, they inhibit the ligase activity of the type II topoisomerases, DNA gyrase and topoisomerase IV, which cut DNA to introduce supercoiling, while leaving nuclease activity unaffected. With the ligase activity disrupted, these enzymes release DNA with single- and double-strand breaks that lead to cell death. The majority of quinolones in clinical use are fluoroquinolones, which have a fluorine atom attached to the central ring system, typically at the 6-position or C-8 position. Most of them are named with the -oxacin suffix. First and second generation quinolones are largely active against Gram-negative bacteria, whereas third and fourth generation quinolones have increased activity against Gram-positive and anaerobic bacteria. Some quinolones containing aromatic substituents at their C-7 positions are highly active against eukaryotic type II topoisomerase.

It has also been proposed that quinolone antibiotics cause oxidation of guanine nucleotides in the bacterial nucleotide pool, and that this process contributes to the cytotoxicity of these agents. The incorporation of oxidized guanine nucleotides into DNA could be bactericidal. Bacterial cytotoxicity could arise from incomplete repair of closely spaced 8-oxo-2'-deoxyguanosine in the DNA resulting in double-strand breaks.

=== Cellular uptake ===
Fluoroquinolones can enter in cells easily via porins, so are often used to treat intracellular pathogens such as Legionella pneumophila and Mycoplasma pneumoniae. For many Gram-negative bacteria, DNA gyrase is the target, whereas topoisomerase IV is the target for many Gram-positive bacteria.

Eukaryotic cells are not believed to contain DNA gyrase or topoisomerase IV. However, debate exists concerning whether the quinolones still have such an adverse effect on the DNA of healthy cells. Some compounds in this class have been shown to inhibit the synthesis of mitochondrial DNA.

== Pharmacology ==
The basic pharmacophore, or active structure, of the fluoroquinolone class is based upon the quinoline ring system. Various substitutions made to the quinoline ring resulted in the development of numerous fluoroquinolone drugs. The addition of the fluorine atom at C-6 distinguishes the successive-generation fluoroquinolones from the first-generation quinolones, although examples are known that omit the atom while retaining antibacterial activity.

=== Pharmacokinetics ===
Pharmacokinetics of newer fluoroquinolones following a single oral dose
Drug	Dosage^{a} (mg)	BA (%)	C_{max} (μg/mL)	t_{max} (h)	AUC (μg • h/mL)	t_{1/2} (h)	Vd/F (L/kg)	Protein binding (%)	Excreted unchanged (%)	Dose adjustment	
Drug	Dosage^{a} (mg)	BA (%)	C_{max} (μg/mL)	t_{max} (h)	AUC (μg • h/mL)	t_{1/2} (h)	Vd/F (L/kg)	Protein binding (%)	Excreted unchanged (%)	Renal	Hepatic
Ciprofloxacin	500; 750	70; 70	2.30; 3.00	1.2; 1.2	10.1; 14.0	3.5; 3.5	3.5; 3.5	30; 30	34; 34	Yes; Yes	No; No
Garenoxacin	400; 600	ND; 92	5.0; 10.4	ND; 1.2	60; 96.7	14.2; 9.8	ND; ND	75; ND	40; ND	ND; ND	ND; ND
Gatifloxacin	400	96	3.86	1.5	33.8	8.0	1.8	20	76	Yes	No
Gemifloxacin	320; 640	70; 70	1.19; 2.29	1.2; 1.2	7.3; 15.9	8.0; 8.0	3.5; 3.5	60; 60	27; 27	Yes; Yes	No; No
Levofloxacin	500; 750	99; 99	5.08; 7.13	1.7; 1.7	48.0; 82.0	6.9; 6.9	1.1; 1.1	31; 31	83; 83	Yes; Yes	ND; ND
Moxifloxacin	200; 400	86; 86	1.16; 3.34	1.7; 1.7	15.4; 33.8	12.1; 12.1	3.3; 3.3	47; 47	19; 19	No; No	No; No
^{a} = Dosage applies only to C_{max} and AUC. The other parameters an average of the values available in the literature irrespective of dosage.

== History ==
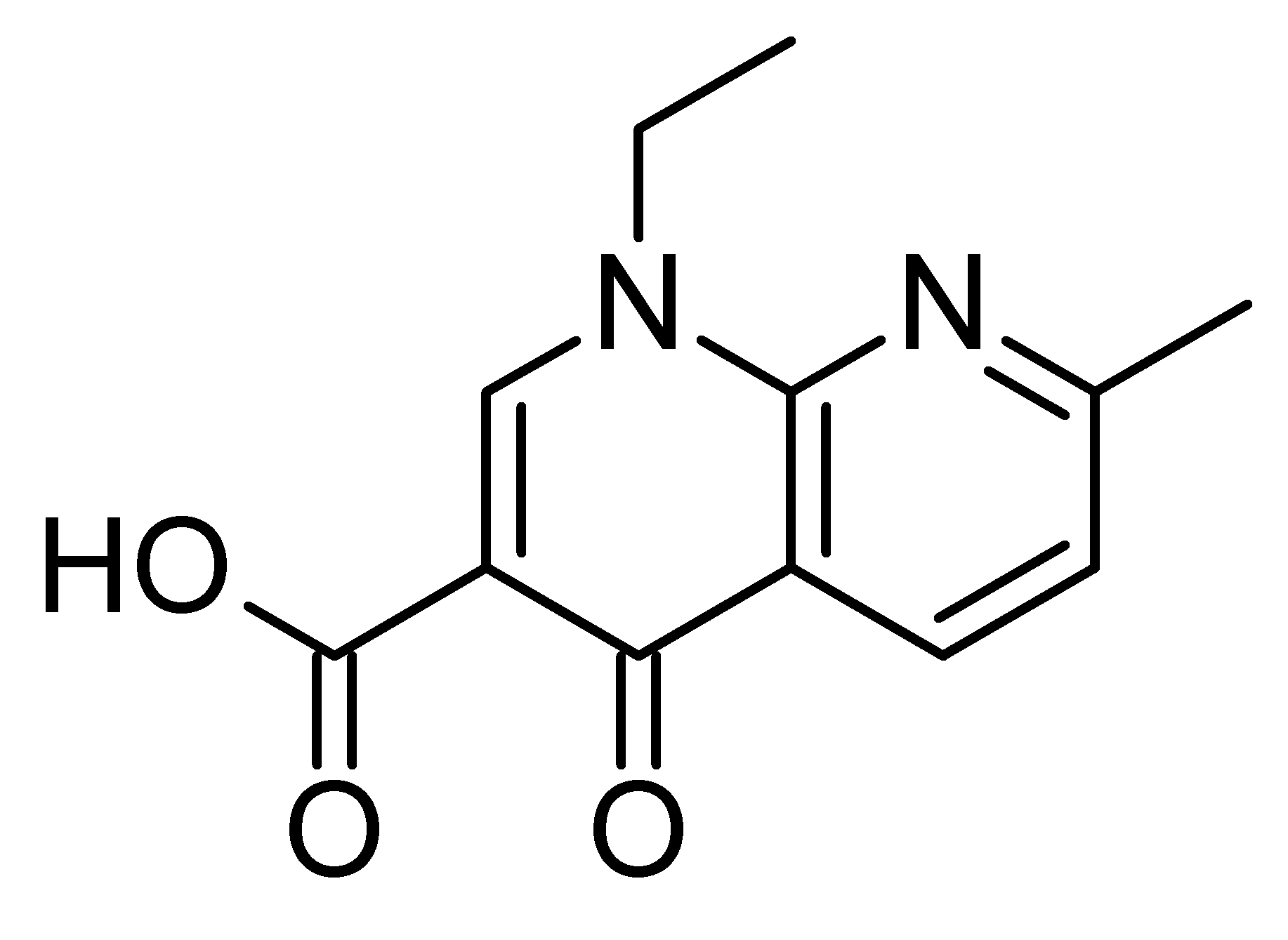
Nalidixic acid. Although technically a naphthyridine, it is considered the predecessor of all subsequently developed quinolone antibiotics.

Although not formally a quinolone, nalidixic acid is considered the first quinolone drug. It was introduced in 1962 for treatment of urinary tract infections (UTIs) in humans. Nalidixic acid was discovered by George Lesher and coworkers in a distillate during an attempt at chloroquine synthesis. Nalidixic acid is thus considered to be the predecessor of all members of the quinolone family, including the second, third and fourth generations commonly known as fluoroquinolones. Since the introduction of nalidixic acid, more than 10,000 analogs have been synthesized, but only a handful have found their way into clinical practice. The first generation also included other quinolone drugs, such as pipemidic acid, oxolinic acid, and cinoxacin, which were introduced in the 1970s. They proved to be only marginal improvements over nalidixic acid.

These drugs were widely used as a first-line treatment for many infections, including very commons ones such as acute sinusitis, acute bronchitis, and uncomplicated UTIs. Reports of serious adverse events began emerging, and the FDA first added a black-box warning to fluoroquinolones in July 2008 for the increased risk of tendinitis and tendon rupture. In February 2011, the risk of worsening symptoms for those with myasthenia gravis was added to the warning. In August 2013, the agency required updates to the labels to describe the potential for irreversible peripheral neuropathy (serious nerve damage).

In November 2015, an FDA Advisory Committee discussed the risks and benefits of fluoroquinolones for the treatment of acute bacterial sinusitis, acute bacterial exacerbation of chronic bronchitis, and uncomplicated UTIs based on new safety information. The new information focused on two or more side effects occurring at the same time and causing the potential for irreversible impairment. The advisory committee concluded that the serious risks associated with the use of fluoroquinolones for these types of uncomplicated infections generally outweighed the benefits for patients with other treatment options. The 21-member joint committee overwhelmingly recommended stronger label warnings on the containers because of rare but sometimes devastating side effects.

On 12 May 2016, the FDA issued a drug safety communication advising that fluoroquinolones should be reserved for these conditions only when no other options are available due to potentially permanent, disabling side effects occurring together. The drug safety communication also announced the required labeling updates to reflect this new safety information. The FDA put out another label change in July 2017, strengthening the warnings about potentially disabling adverse effects and limiting use of these drugs to second-line treatments for acute sinusitis, acute bronchitis, and uncomplicated UTIs.

=== Generations ===
The first generation of the quinolones began following introduction of the related, but structurally distinct naphthyridine-family nalidixic acid in 1962 for treatment of UTIs in humans. Nalidixic acid was discovered by George Lesher and coworkers in a chemical distillate during an attempt at synthesis of the chloroquinoline antimalarial agent, chloroquine. Naphthyridone and quinolone classes of antibiotics prevent bacterial DNA replication by inhibition of DNA unwinding events, and can be both bacteriostatic and bacteriocidal. (See Mechanism of Action earlier.) The majority of quinolones in clinical use belong to the second generation class of "fluoroquinolones", which have a true quinoline framework, maintain the C-3 carboxylic acid group, and add a fluorine atom to the all-carbon containing ring, typically at the C-6 or C-8 positions.

Sites of substitution in second-generation fluoroquinolone antibiotics: Here, and in following the orientation of the quinolones are flipped with respect to horizontal and vertical axes, relative to earlier images; the nitrogen (N)-containing pyridine ring is now on the left, and the N-1 atom and C-6 carbonyl are at 12 o'clock and 6 o'clock in the pyridine ring. The characteristic 6-fluoro group is shown in red. For instance, in ciprofloxacin, above, the R substituent attached to the N-1 atom is a cyclopropyl group, the R substituent in blue is a piperazine moiety, and the remaining substitution sites (R groups) are hydrogen atoms.

Quinolones can be classified into generations based on their antibacterial spectrums. The earlier-generation agents are, in general, more narrow-spectrum than the later ones, but no standard is employed to determine which drug belongs to which generation. The only universal standard applied is the grouping of the non-fluorinated drugs found within this class (quinolones) within the first-generation heading. As such, a wide variation exists within the literature dependent upon the methods employed by the authors.

The first generation is rarely used. Frequently prescribed drugs are moxifloxacin, ciprofloxacin, levofloxacin.

==== First generation ====
- flumequine (veterinary use)
- oxolinic acid
- rosoxacin

Structurally related first-generation drugs, but formally not 4-quinolones, include cinoxacin, nalidixic acid, and piromidic acid, pipemidic acid

==== Second generation ====
The second-generation class is sometimes subdivided into "Class 1" and "Class 2".

- ciprofloxacin
- fleroxacin
- lomefloxacin
- nadifloxacin
- norfloxacin
- ofloxacin
- pefloxacin
- rufloxacin

A structurally related second-generation drug, but formally not a 4-quinolone, is enoxacin.

==== Third generation ====
Unlike the first and second generations, the third generation is active against streptococci.

- balofloxacin
- grepafloxacin
- levofloxacin
- pazufloxacin
- sparfloxacin
- temafloxacin

A structurally related third-generation drug, but formally not a 4-quinolone, is tosufloxacin (Ozex, Tosacin).

==== Fourth generation ====
Fourth-generation fluoroquinolones act at DNA gyrase and topoisomerase IV. This dual action slows development of resistance.

- clinafloxacin
- gatifloxacin
- moxifloxacin
- sitafloxacin
- prulifloxacin
- besifloxacin
- delafloxacin

Two structurally related fourth-generation drugs, but formally not 4-quinolones, are gemifloxacin and trovafloxacin (removed from clinical use).

In development:

- ozenoxacin

=== Veterinary use ===
Quinolones have been widely used in animal husbandry, and several agents have veterinary-specific applications.

- danofloxacin – 2nd gen, related to ciprofloxacin
- difloxacin – 2nd/3rd gen, related to temafloxacin
- enrofloxacin – 2nd gen, metabolizes into ciprofloxacin
- ibafloxacin – 3rd gen, related to levofloxacin
- marbofloxacin – 3rd gen, related to levofloxacin
- orbifloxacin – 3rd gen, related to sparfloxacin
- sarafloxacin – 2nd/3rd gen, related to difloxacin
- pradofloxacin – 3rd gen
