= Ofloxacin =

Antibiotic to treat bacterial infections

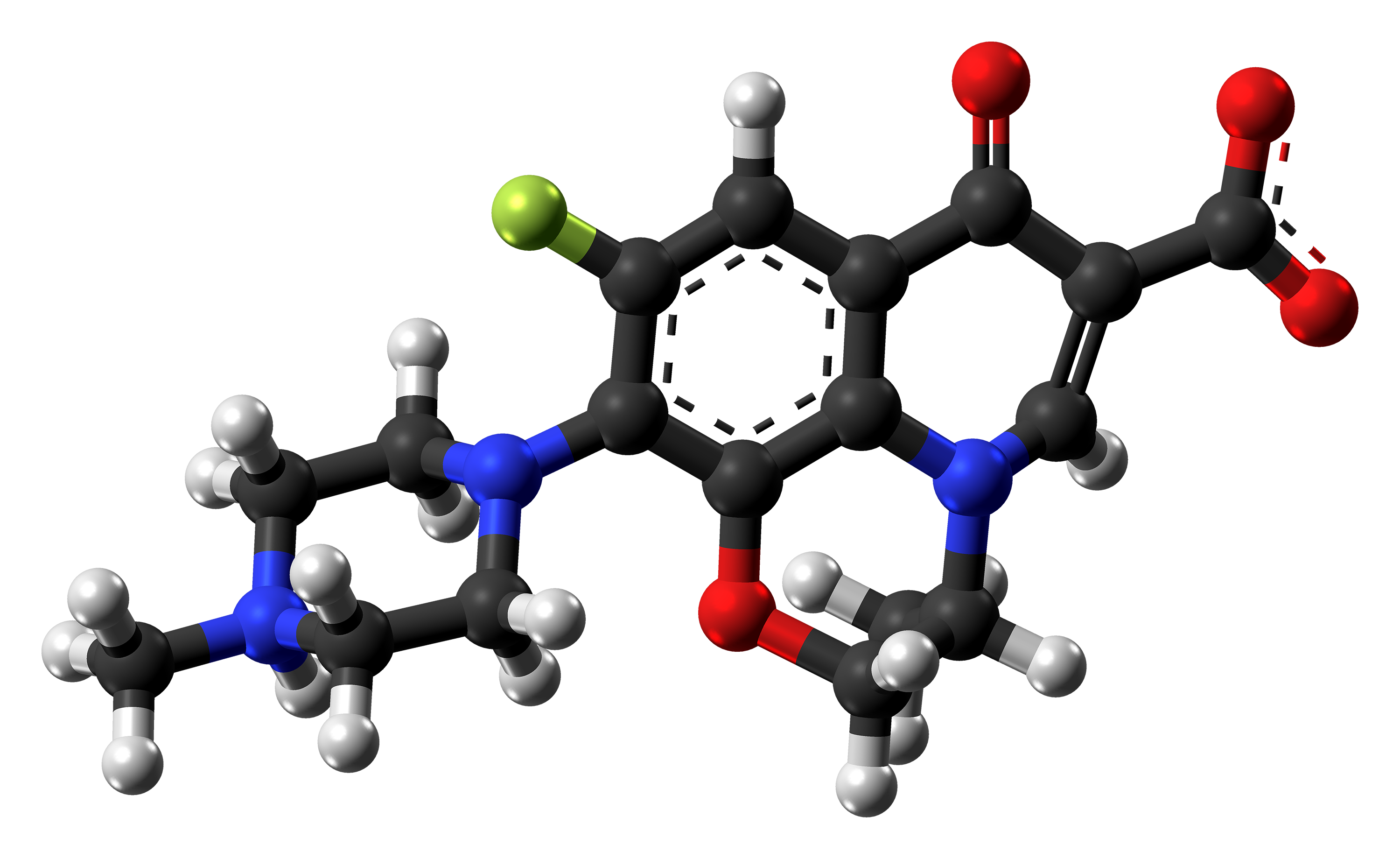

Clinical data
- Trade names: Floxin, Ocuflox, others
- AHFS/Drugs.com: Monograph
- MedlinePlus: a691005
- License data: US DailyMed: Ofloxacin
- Routes of administration: By mouth, intravenous therapy, topical (eye drops and ear drops)
- ATC code: J01MA01 (WHO) J01RA17 (WHO), J01RA18 (WHO), S01AE01 (WHO), S02AA16 (WHO)

Legal status
- Legal status: US: ℞-only

Pharmacokinetic data
- Bioavailability: 85–95%
- Protein binding: 32%
- Elimination half-life: 8–9 hours

Identifiers
- IUPAC name: (RS)-7-fluoro-2-methyl-6-(4-methylpiperazin-1-yl)-10-oxo-4-oxa-1-azatricyclo[7.3.1.0^{5,13}]trideca-5(13),6,8,11-tetraene-11-carboxylic acid
- CAS Number: 82419-36-1
- PubChem CID: 4583
- DrugBank: DB01165
- ChemSpider: 4422
- UNII: A4P49JAZ9H
- KEGG: D00453
- ChEBI: CHEBI:7731
- ChEMBL: ChEMBL4
- CompTox Dashboard (EPA): DTXSID3041085
- ECHA InfoCard: 100.205.209

Chemical and physical data
- Formula: C_{18}H_{20}FN_{3}O_{4}
- Molar mass: 361.373 g·mol^{−1}
- 3D model (JSmol): Interactive image
- Chirality: Racemic mixture
- Melting point: 250–257 °C (482–495 °F)
- SMILES: Fc4cc1c2N(/C=C(\C1=O)C(=O)O)C(COc2c4N3CCN(C)CC3)C
- InChI: InChI=1S/C18H20FN3O4/c1-10-9-26-17-14-11(16(23)12(18(24)25)8-22(10)14)7-13(19)15(17)21-5-3-20(2)4-6-21/h7-8,10H,3-6,9H2,1-2H3,(H,24,25); Key:GSDSWSVVBLHKDQ-UHFFFAOYSA-N

Ofloxacin, sold under the brand name Floxin among others, is a quinolone antibiotic useful for the treatment of a number of bacterial infections. When taken by mouth or injection into a vein, these include pneumonia, cellulitis, urinary tract infections, prostatitis, plague, and certain types of infectious diarrhea. Other uses, along with other medications, include treating multidrug resistant tuberculosis. An eye drop may be used for a superficial bacterial infection of the eye and an ear drop may be used for otitis media when a hole in the ear drum is present.

When taken by mouth, common side effects include vomiting, diarrhea, headache, and rash. Other serious side effect include tendon rupture, numbness due to nerve damage, seizures, and psychosis. Use in pregnancy is typically not recommended. Ofloxacin is in the fluoroquinolone family of medications. It works by interfering with the bacterium's DNA.

Ofloxacin was patented in 1980 and approved for medical use in 1985. It is on the World Health Organization's List of Essential Medicines. Ofloxacin is available as a generic medication. In 2023, it was the 169th most commonly prescribed medication in the United States, with more than 2 million prescriptions.

== Medical uses ==
Ofloxacin is used in the treatment of bacterial infections such as:

- Acute bacterial exacerbations of chronic obstructive pulmonary disease (COPD)
- Community-acquired pneumonia
- Uncomplicated skin and skin structure infections
- Nongonococcal urethritis and cervicitis
- Epididymitis
- Mixed Infections of the urethra and cervix
- Acute pelvic inflammatory disease
- Uncomplicated cystitis
- Complicated urinary tract infections
- Prostatitis
- Acute, uncomplicated urethral and cervical gonorrhea

Ofloxacin has not been shown to be effective in the treatment of syphilis.

Fluoroquinolones, the class of drug ofloxacin belongs to, were the drug of choice for treating gonorrhea in the 1980s; However, due to the development of fluoroquinolone-resistant Neisseria gonorrhoeae, fluoroquinolones were no longer used to treat gonorrhea by the late 1990s. As of 2004, the failure of single dose ofloxacin to treat gonorrhea has been reported in the United States, United Kingdom, Canada, and Australia.

=== Susceptible bacteria ===
According to the product package insert, ofloxacin is effective against these microorganisms:

Aerobic Gram-positive microorganisms:

- Staphylococcus aureus (methicillin-susceptible strains)
- Streptococcus pneumoniae (penicillin-susceptible strains)
- Streptococcus pyogenes

Aerobic Gram-negative microorganisms

- Citrobacter koseri (Citrobacter diversus)
- Enterobacter aerogenes
- Escherichia coli
- Haemophilus influenzae
- Klebsiella pneumoniae
- Neisseria gonorrhoeae
- Proteus mirabilis
- Pseudomonas aeruginosa

Other microorganisms:

- Chlamydia trachomatis

== Adverse effects ==
In general, fluoroquinolones are well tolerated, with most side effects being mild to moderate. On occasion, serious adverse effects occur. Common side effects include gastrointestinal effects such as nausea, vomiting, and diarrhea, as well as headache and insomnia.

The overall rate of adverse events in patients treated with fluoroquinolones is roughly similar to that seen in patients treated with other antibiotic classes. A U.S. Centers for Disease Control study found patients treated with fluoroquinolones experienced adverse events severe enough to lead to an emergency department visit more frequently than those treated with cephalosporins or macrolides, but less frequently than those treated with penicillins, clindamycin, sulfonamides, or vancomycin.

Postmarketing surveillance has revealed a variety of relatively rare but serious adverse effects associated with all members of the fluoroquinolone antibacterial class. Among these, tendon problems and exacerbation of the symptoms of the neurological disorder myasthenia gravis are the subject of "black box" warnings in the United States. The most severe form of tendonopathy associated with fluoroquinolone administration is tendon rupture, which in the great majority of cases involves the Achilles tendon. Younger people typically experience good recovery, but permanent disability is possible, and is more likely in older patients. The overall frequency of fluoroquinolone-associated Achilles tendon rupture in patients treated with ciprofloxacin or levofloxacin has been estimated at 17 per 100,000 treatments. Risk is substantially elevated in the elderly and in those with recent exposure to topical or systemic corticosteroid therapy. Simultaneous use of corticosteroids is present in almost one-third of quinolone-associated tendon rupture. Tendon damage may manifest during and up to a year after fluoroquinolone therapy has been completed.

Fluoroquinolones prolong the QT interval by blocking voltage-gated potassium channels. Prolongation of the QT interval can lead to torsades de pointes, a life-threatening arrhythmia, but in practice, this appears relatively uncommon in part because the most widely prescribed fluoroquinolones (ciprofloxacin and levofloxacin) only minimally prolong the QT interval.

Clostridioides difficile-associated diarrhea may occur in connection with the use of any antibacterial drug, especially those with a broad spectrum of activity such as clindamycin, cephalosporins, and fluoroquinolones. Fluoroquinoline treatment is associated with risk similar to or less than that associated with broad spectrum cephalosporins. Fluoroquinolone administration may be associated with the acquisition and outgrowth of a particularly virulent Clostridium strain.

The US prescribing information contains a warning regarding uncommon cases of peripheral neuropathy, which can be permanent. Other nervous system effects include insomnia, restlessness, and rarely, seizure, convulsions, and psychosis Other rare and serious adverse events have been observed with varying degrees of evidence for causation.

Events that may occur in acute overdose are rare, and include kidney failure and seizure. Susceptible groups of patients, such as children and the elderly, are at greater risk of adverse reactions during therapeutic use.

Ofloxacin, like some other fluoroquinolones, may inhibit drug-metabolizing enzymes, and thereby increase blood levels of other drugs such as cyclosporine, theophylline, and warfarin, among others. These increased blood levels may result in a greater risk of side effects.

Careful monitoring of serum glucose is advised when ofloxacin or other fluorquinolones are used by people who are taking sulfonylurea antidiabetes drugs.

The concomitant administration of a nonsteroidal anti-inflammatory drug with a quinolone, including ofloxacin, may increase the risk of central nervous system stimulation and convulsive seizures.

The fluoroquinolones have been shown to increase the anticoagulant effect of acenocoumarol, anisindione, and dicumarol. Additionally, the risk of cardiotoxicity and arrhythmias is increased when co-administered with drugs such as dihydroquinidine barbiturate, quinidine, and quinidine barbiturate.

Current or past treatment with oral corticosteroids is associated with an increased risk of Achilles tendon rupture, especially in elderly patients who are also taking the fluoroquinolones.

== Contraindications ==
As noted above, under licensed use, ofloxacin is now considered to be contraindicated for the treatment of certain sexually transmitted diseases by some experts due to bacterial resistance. Caution should be used in people with liver disease. The excretion of ofloxacin may be reduced in patients with severe liver function disorders (e.g., cirrhosis with or without ascites). Ofloxacin is also considered to be contraindicated within the pediatric population, pregnancy, nursing mothers, patients with psychiatric illnesses and in patients with epilepsy or other seizure disorders.

=== Pregnancy ===
Ofloxacin has not been shown to have any teratogenic effects at oral doses as high as 810 mg/kg/day (11 times the recommended maximum human dose based on mg/m^{2} or 50 times based on mg/kg) and 160 mg/kg/day (four times the recommended maximum human dose based on mg/m^{2} or 10 times based on mg/kg) when administered to pregnant rats and rabbits, respectively. Additional studies in rats with oral doses up to 360 mg/kg/day (five times the recommended maximum human dose based on mg/m2 or 23 times based on mg/kg) demonstrated no adverse effect on late fetal development, labor, delivery, lactation, neonatal viability, or growth of the newborn. Doses equivalent to 50 and 10 times the recommended maximum human dose of ofloxacin (based on mg/kg) were fetotoxic (i.e., decreased fetal body weight and increased fetal mortality) in rats and rabbits, respectively. Minor skeletal variations were reported in rats receiving doses of 810 mg/kg/day, which is more than 10 times higher than the recommended maximum human dose based on mg/m^{2}.

There are, however, no adequate and well-controlled studies in pregnant women. Ofloxacin should be used during pregnancy only if the potential benefit justifies the potential risk to the fetus.

=== Children ===
Oral and intravenous ofloxacin are not licensed for use in children, except as noted above, due to the risk of musculoskeletal injury. In one study, 1534 juvenile patients (age 6 months to 16 years) treated with levofloxacin as part of three efficacy trials were followed up to assess all musculoskeletal events occurring up to 12 months after treatment. At 12 months' follow-up, the cumulative incidence of musculoskeletal adverse events was 3.4%, compared to 1.8% among 893 patients treated with other antibiotics. In the levafloxacin-treated group, about two-thirds of these musculoskeletal adverse events occurred in the first 60 days, 86% were mild, 17% were moderate, and all resolved without long-term sequelae.

In a study comparing the safety and efficacy of levofloxacin to that of azithromycin or ceftriaxone in 712 children with community-acquired pneumonia, adverse events were experienced by 6% of those treated with levofloxacin and 4% of those treated with comparator antibiotics. Most of these adverse events were thought to be unrelated or doubtfully related to the levofloxacin. Two deaths were observed in the levofloxacin group, neither of which was thought to be treatment-related. Spontaneous reports to the FDA Adverse Effects Reporting System at the time of the 20 September 2011 FDA Pediatric Drugs Advisory Committee include musculoskeletal events (39, including five cases of tendon rupture) and central nervous system events (19, including five cases of seizures) as the most common spontaneous reports between April 2005 and March 2008. An estimated 130,000 pediatric prescriptions for levofloxacin were filled on behalf of 112,000 pediatric patients during that period.

== Overdose ==
Limited information is available on overdose with ofloxacin. Advice for the management of an acute overdose of ofloxacin is emptying of the stomach, along with close observation, and making sure that the patient is appropriately hydrated. Hemodialysis or peritoneal dialysis is of only limited effectiveness. Overdose may result in central nervous system toxicity, cardiovascular toxicity, tendon/articular toxicity, and hepatic toxicity as well as kidney failure and seizure. Both seizures and severe psychiatric reactions have, however, been reported to occur at therapeutic dosage.

== Pharmacokinetics ==
The two enantiomers of the ofloxacin molecule, levofloxacin or S-ofloxacin (top) and dextrofloxacin or R-ofloxacin (bottom). Only levofloxacin is biologically active, and is thus solely responsible for the effects of the drug.

The bioavailability of ofloxacin in the tablet form is roughly 98% following oral administration, reaching maximum serum concentrations within one to two hours. Between 65% and 80% of an administered oral dose of ofloxacin is excreted unchanged via the kidneys within 48 hours of dosing. Therefore, elimination is mainly by renal excretion. However, 4-8% of an ofloxacin dose is excreted in the feces. This would indicate a small degree of biliary excretion, as well. Plasma elimination half-life is around 4 to 5 hours in patients and 6.4 to 7.4 hours in elderly patients.

Ofloxacin is a racemic mixture, which consists of 50% levofloxacin (the biologically active component) and 50% of its "mirror image" or enantiomer dextrofloxacin.

"After multiple-dose administration of 200 mg and 300 mg doses, peak serum levels of 2.2 and 3.6 μg/ml, respectively, are predicted at steady-state. In vitro, approximately 32% of the drug in plasma is protein bound. Floxin is widely distributed to body tissues. Ofloxacin has been detected in blister fluid, cervix, lung tissue, ovary, prostatic fluid, prostatic tissue, skin, and sputum. The pyridobenzoxazine ring appears to decrease the extent of parent compound metabolism. Less than 5% is eliminated by the kidneys as desmethyl or N-oxide metabolites; 4% to 8% by feces."

A number of the endogenous compounds have been reported to be affected by ofloxacin as inhibitors, alteraters, and depletors. See the latest package insert for ofloxacin for additional details.

== Mode of action ==
Ofloxacin is a broad-spectrum antibiotic that is active against both Gram-positive and Gram-negative bacteria. It functions by inhibiting two bacterial type II topoisomerases, DNA gyrase and topoisomerase IV. Topoisomerase IV is an enzyme necessary to separate (mostly in prokaryotes, in bacteria in particular) replicated DNA, thereby inhibiting bacterial cell division.

== History ==
Ofloxacin is a second-generation fluoroquinolone, being a broader-spectrum analog of norfloxacin, and was synthesized and developed by scientists at Daiichi Seiyaku.

It was first approved for marketing in Japan in 1985, for oral administration, and Daiichi marketed it there under the brand name Tarvid. Daiichi, working with Johnson & Johnson, obtained FDA approval in December 1990, under the brand name Floxin, labelled for use in adults with lower respiratory tract infections, skin and skin structure infections, urinary tract infections, prostatitis, and sexually transmitted diseases. By 1991, it was also marketed as Tarvid by Hoechst in the UK, Germany, Belgium, and Portugal; as Oflocet in France, Portugal, Tunisia, and several African countries by Roussel-Uclaf, as Oflocin by Glaxo in Italy, and as Flobacin by Sigma-Tau in Italy.

The market for ofloxacin was seen as difficult from its launch; it was approved as a "1C" drug, a new molecular entity with little or no therapeutic gain over existing therapies, and ciprofloxacin, which had a broader spectrum, was already on the market.

By 1992, an intravenous solution was approved for marketing,

In 1997, an indication for pelvic inflammatory disease was approved by the U.S. Food and Drug Administration (FDA) for the oral formulation, and in the same year, a solution for ear infections was approved under the brand

Daiichi and J&J also cannibalized its own market by introducing levofloxacin, the levo-enantiomer of ofloxacin, in 1996; Johnson and Johnson's annual sales of Floxin in 2003 was about $30 million, whereas their combined sales of Levaquin/Floxin exceeded $1.15 billion in the same year. Johnson & Johnson withdrew the marketing application in 2009.

== Society and culture ==
=== Available forms ===
Ofloxacin for systemic use is available in multiple strengths as a tablet, an oral suspension, and an injectable solution. It is also used as eye drops and ear drops and is available in combination with ornidazole.

=== Antibiotic use and bacterial resistance ===
Resistance to ofloxacin and other fluoroquinolones may evolve rapidly, even during a course of treatment. Numerous pathogens, including Staphylococcus aureus, enterococci, and Streptococcus pyogenes now exhibit resistance worldwide.

Floxacin and other fluoroquinolones had become the most commonly prescribed class of antibiotics to adults in 2002. Nearly half (42%) of these prescriptions were for conditions not approved by the US Food and Drug Administration (FDA), such as acute bronchitis, otitis media, and acute upper respiratory tract infection.
