= Enrofloxacin =

Chemical compound

Clinical data
- Trade names: Baytril, others
- AHFS/Drugs.com: International Drug Names
- License data: US DailyMed: Enrofloxacin
- Pregnancy category: AU: B3
- Routes of administration: By mouth, subcutaneous, intramuscular
- ATCvet code: QJ01MA90 (WHO) QD06BA51 (WHO)

Legal status
- Legal status: AU: S4 (Prescription only); UK: POM (Prescription only); US: ℞-only

Pharmacokinetic data
- Bioavailability: 80% in dogs, 65-75% in sheep
- Metabolism: Kidney and non-kidney
- Elimination half-life: 4–5 hours in dogs, 6 hours in cats, 1.5 - 4.5 hours in sheep
- Excretion: Bile duct (70%); kidney (30%)

Identifiers
- IUPAC name: 1-cyclopropyl-7-(4-ethylpiperazin-1-yl)-6-fluoro-4-oxo-1,4-dihydroquinoline-3-carboxylic acid
- CAS Number: 93106-60-6
- PubChem CID: 71188
- DrugBank: DB11404
- ChemSpider: 64326
- UNII: 3DX3XEK1BN
- KEGG: D02473
- ChEBI: CHEBI:35720
- ChEMBL: ChEMBL15511
- CompTox Dashboard (EPA): DTXSID1045619
- ECHA InfoCard: 100.131.355

Chemical and physical data
- Formula: C_{19}H_{22}FN_{3}O_{3}
- Molar mass: 359.401 g·mol^{−1}
- 3D model (JSmol): Interactive image
- Melting point: 219 to 221 °C (426 to 430 °F)
- SMILES: O=C(O)\C3=C\N(c2cc(N1CCN(CC)CC1)c(F)cc2C3=O)C4CC4
- InChI: InChI=1S/C19H22FN3O3/c1-2-21-5-7-22(8-6-21)17-10-16-13(9-15(17)20)18(24)14(19(25)26)11-23(16)12-3-4-12/h9-12H,2-8H2,1H3,(H,25,26); Key:SPFYMRJSYKOXGV-UHFFFAOYSA-N

Enrofloxacin, sold under the brand name Baytril, among others, is a fluoroquinolone antibiotic used for the treatment of animals. It is a bactericidal agent.

The bactericidal activity of enrofloxacin is concentration-dependent, with susceptible bacteria cell death occurring within 20–30 minutes of exposure. Enrofloxacin has demonstrated a significant post-antibiotic effect for both Gram-negative and Gram-positive bacteria and is active in both stationary and growth phases of bacterial replication. Enrofloxacin is partially deethylated by CYP450 into the active metabolite ciprofloxacin, which is also a fluoroquinolone antibiotic.

In September 2005, the FDA withdrew approval of enrofloxacin for use in water to treat flocks of poultry, as the practice was noted to promote the evolution of fluoroquinolone-resistant strains of the bacterium Campylobacter, a human pathogen. Enrofloxacin is available as a fixed-dose combination medication with silver sulfadiazine for the treatment of canine otitis externa. It is available as a generic medication.

== Activity and susceptibility data ==
Enrofloxacin is a synthetic antibacterial agent from the class of the fluoroquinolone carboxylic acid derivatives. It has antibacterial activity against a broad spectrum of Gram-negative and Gram-positive bacteria. It is effective against:

- Pseudomonas aeruginosa
- Klebsiella
- Escherichia coli
- Enterobacter
- Campylobacter
- Shigella
- Salmonella
- Aeromonas
- Haemophilus
- Proteus
- Yersinia
- Serratia
- Vibrio
- Brucella
- Chlamydia trachomatis
- Staphylococcus (including penicillinase-producing and methicillin-resistant strains)
- Mycoplasma
- Mycobacterium

Variable activity against:

- Streptococcus

Ineffective against:

- Anaerobes

The following data represent minimum inhibitory concentration ranges for a few medically significant bacterial pathogens:

- Escherichia coli - 0.022 - 0.03 μg/mL
- Staphylococcus aureus - 0.0925 - 64 μg/mL
- Pseudomonas aeruginosa - 0.05 μg/mL

== Adverse effects/warnings ==
Enrofloxacin was banned for poultry use in the United States in 2005.

== Overdosage/acute toxicity ==
It is unlikely that an acute overdose of either compound would result in symptoms more serious than either anorexia or vomiting, but the adverse effects noted above could occur. Dogs receiving 10 times the labeled dosage rate of enrofloxacin for at least 14 days developed only vomiting and anorexia. Death did occur in some dogs when fed 25 times the labeled rate for 11 days, however.

- Oral LD_{50}: greater than 5000 mg/kg
- Dermal LD_{50}: greater than 2000 mg/kg
- Inhalation LD_{50}: greater than 3547 mg/m3 (4-hour exposure)
- Eye effects: irritant; reversible in less than 7 days.

In cats, enrofloxacin is retinotoxic and can produce sudden-onset blindness, often irreversible.

== Degradation ==
The brown rot fungus Gloeophyllum striatum can degrade the fluoroquinolone enrofloxacin using hydroxyl radicals.
