= Topoisomerase IV =

Bacterial enzyme

Topoisomerase IV is one of two type II topoisomerases in bacteria, the other being DNA gyrase. Like gyrase, topoisomerase IV is able to pass one double-strand of DNA through another double-strand of DNA, thereby changing the linking number of DNA by two in each enzymatic step. Both share a hetero-4-mer structure formed by a symmetric homodimer of A/B heterodimers, usually named ParC and ParE.

== Functions ==
Topoisomerase IV has two functions in the cell.

- First, it is responsible for unlinking, or decatenating, DNA following DNA replication. The double-helical nature of DNA and its semiconservative mode of replication causes the two newly replicated DNA strands to be interlinked. These links must be removed in order for the chromosome (and plasmids) to segregate into daughter cells so that cell division can complete.
- Topoisomerase IV's second function in the cell is to relax positive supercoils. It shares this role with DNA gyrase, which is also able to relax positive supercoils. Together, gyrase and topoisomerase IV remove the positive supercoils that accumulate ahead of a translocating DNA polymerase, allowing DNA replication to continue unhindered by topological strain.
- DNA gyrases are analogous enzymes in other organisms.

While topoisomerase IV does relax positive supercoils like DNA gyrase, it does not introduce further negative supercoiling like the latter enzyme.

Topoisomerase IV can unknot right-handed knots and decatenate right-handed catenanes without acting on right-handed plectonemes in negatively supercoiled DNA molecules, based on geometrical specificity of juxtapositions.

== Clinical significance ==
Topoisomerase IV is also a target of antibiotics, such as the quinolone drugs, which include ciprofloxacin.
