= C15H21NO2 =

The molecular formula C_{15}H_{21}NO_{2} may refer to:

- 2C-G-5
- Ciclafrine
- Ciclonicate
- Desmethylprodine
- Ethylphenidate
- Eucaine
- Indenolol
- Ketobemidone
- Methoxetamine
- trans-3-(4-Methoxyphenyl)-N-(pentan-3-yl)acrylamide
- 4-Methylmethylphenidate
- MPPP
- Naxagolide
- Pethidine
- Prodilidine
