= C22H31N3O5 =

The molecular formula C_{22}H_{31}N_{3}O_{5} (molar mass: 417.50 g/mol) may refer to:

- Cilazapril
- Cinepazide, or cinepazide maleate
