= Vinburnine =

Chemical compound

Clinical data
- Other names: 3a-Ethyl-2,3,3a,4,10,11b-hexahydro-1H,11H-5a,11a-diaza-benzo[cd]fluoranthen-5-one
- AHFS/Drugs.com: International Drug Names
- ATC code: C04AX17 (WHO)

Identifiers
- IUPAC name: (3α,16α)-14,15-Dihydroeburnamenin-14-one
- CAS Number: 4880-88-0
- PubChem CID: 71203
- IUPHAR/BPS: 345
- ChemSpider: 64339
- UNII: G54D0HMY25
- KEGG: D08676
- ChEMBL: ChEMBL1892145
- CompTox Dashboard (EPA): DTXSID6045119
- ECHA InfoCard: 100.023.172

Chemical and physical data
- Formula: C_{19}H_{22}N_{2}O
- Molar mass: 294.398 g·mol^{−1}
- 3D model (JSmol): Interactive image
- SMILES: CC[C@@]12CCCN3[C@@H]1C4=C(CC3)C5=CC=CC=C5N4C(=O)C2
- InChI: InChI=1S/C19H22N2O/c1-2-19-9-5-10-20-11-8-14-13-6-3-4-7-15(13)21(16(22)12-19)17(14)18(19)20/h3-4,6-7,18H,2,5,8-12H2,1H3/t18-,19+/m1/s1; Key:WYJAPUKIYAZSEM-MOPGFXCFSA-N

Vinburnine (or eburnamonine, Vincamone) is a vasodilator. Vincamone is a vinca alkaloid and a metabolite of vincamine.
