= C17H21N3O =

The molecular formula C_{17}H_{21}N_{3}O may refer to:

- RTI-126
- Z3517967757
- VUFB-6683
