= C16H23NO4 =

The molecular formula C_{16}H_{23}NO_{4} (molar mass: 293.36 g/mol) may refer to:

- Cinamolol
- N-t-BOC-MDMA
