= C17H17N =

The molecular formula C_{17}H_{17}N (molar mass: 235.32 g/mol, exact mass: 235.1361 u) may refer to:

- Aporphine
- Azapetine
- SpAMDA
