= ATC code C04 =

Pharmaceutical drug classification

ATC code C04 Peripheral vasodilators is a therapeutic subgroup of the Anatomical Therapeutic Chemical Classification System, a system of alphanumeric codes developed by the World Health Organization (WHO) for the classification of drugs and other medical products. Subgroup C04 is part of the anatomical group C Cardiovascular system.

Codes for veterinary use (ATCvet codes) can be created by placing the letter Q in front of the human ATC code: for example, QC04. ATCvet codes without corresponding human ATC codes are cited with the leading Q in the following list.
National versions of the ATC classification may include additional codes not present in this list, which follows the WHO version.

== C04A Peripheral vasodilators ==
=== C04AA 2-amino-1-phenylethanol derivatives ===
C04AA01 Isoxsuprine
C04AA02 Buphenine
C04AA31 Bamethan

=== C04AB Imidazoline derivatives ===
C04AB01 Phentolamine
C04AB02 Tolazoline

=== C04AC Nicotinic acid and derivatives ===
C04AC01 Nicotinic acid
C04AC02 Nicotinyl alcohol (pyridylcarbinol)
C04AC03 Inositol nicotinate
C04AC07 Ciclonicate

=== C04AD Purine derivatives ===
C04AD01 Pentifylline
C04AD02 Xantinol nicotinate
C04AD03 Pentoxifylline
C04AD04 Etofylline nicotinate
QC04AD90 Propentofylline

=== C04AE Ergot alkaloids ===
C04AE01 Ergoloid mesylates
C04AE02 Nicergoline
C04AE04 Dihydroergocristine
C04AE51 Ergoloid mesylates, combinations
C04AE54 Dihydroergocristine, combinations

=== C04AF Enzymes ===
C04AF01 Kallidinogenase

=== C04AX Other peripheral vasodilators ===
C04AX01 Cyclandelate
C04AX02 Phenoxybenzamine
C04AX07 Vincamine
C04AX10 Moxisylyte
C04AX11 Bencyclane
C04AX17 Vinburnine
C04AX19 Sulcotidil
C04AX20 Buflomedil
C04AX21 Naftidrofuryl
C04AX23 Butalamine
C04AX24 Visnadine
C04AX26 Cetiedil
C04AX27 Cinepazide
C04AX28 Ifenprodil
C04AX30 Azapetine
C04AX32 Fasudil
C04AX33 Clazosentan
