= PDE1 =

Enzyme

Phosphodiesterase I

Identifiers
- EC no.: 3.1.4.1
- CAS no.: 9025-82-5

Databases
- IntEnz: IntEnz view
- BRENDA: BRENDA entry
- ExPASy: NiceZyme view
- KEGG: KEGG entry
- MetaCyc: metabolic pathway
- PRIAM: profile
- PDB structures: RCSB PDB PDBe PDBsum
Search
- PMC: articles
- PubMed: articles
- NCBI: proteins

Phosphodiesterase 1, PDE1, EC 3.1.4.1, systematic name oligonucleotide 5′-nucleotidohydrolase) is a phosphodiesterase enzyme also known as calcium- and calmodulin-dependent phosphodiesterase. It is one of the 11 families of phosphodiesterase (PDE1-PDE11). Phosphodiesterase 1 has three subtypes, PDE1A, PDE1B and PDE1C which divide further into various isoforms. The various isoforms exhibit different affinities for cAMP and cGMP.

== Discovery ==
The existence of the Ca^{2+}-stimulated Phosphodiesterase 1 was first demonstrated by Cheung (1970), Kakiuchi and Yamazaki (1970) as a result of their research on bovine brain and rat brain respectively. It has since been found to be widely distributed in various mammalian tissues as well as in other eukaryotes. It is now one of the most intensively studied member of the PDE superfamily of enzymes, which today represents 11 gene families, and the best characterized one as well.

Further research in the field along with increased availability of monoclonal antibodies has shown that various phosphodiesterase 1 isoenzymes exist and have been identified and purified. It is now known that phosphodiesterase 1 exists as tissue specific isozymes.

== Structure ==
The phosphodiesterase 1 isozyme family belongs to a Class I enzymes, which includes all vertebrate phosphodiesterases and some yeast enzymes. Class I enzymes all have a catalytic core of at least 250 amino acids whereas Class II enzymes lack such a common feature.

Usually vertebrate PDEs are dimers of linear 50–150 kDa proteins. They consist of three functional domains; a conserved catalytic core, a regulatory N-terminus and a C-terminus [3-5]. The proteins are chimeric and each domain is associated with their particular function.

The regulatory N-terminus is substantially different in various phosphodiesterase types. They are flanked by the catalytic core and include regions that auto-inhibit the catalytic domains. They also target sequences that control subcellular localization. In phosphodiesterase 1 this region contains a calmodulin binding domain.

The catalytic domains of phosphodiesterase 1 (and other types of phosphodiesterases) have three helical subdomains: an N-terminal cyclin-fold region, a linker region and a C-terminal helical bundle. A deep hydrophobic pocket is formed at the interface of these subdomains. It is composed of four subsites. They are: a metal binding site (M site), core pocket (Q pocket), hydrophobic pocket (H pocket) and lid region (L region). The M site is placed at the bottom of the hydrophobic pocket with several metal atoms. The metal atoms bind to residues that are completely conserved in all phosphodiesterase family members. The identity of the metal atoms is not known with absolute certainty. However, some evidence indicate that at least one of the metals is zinc and the other is likely to be magnesium. The zinc coordination sphere is composed of three histidines, one aspartate and two water molecules. The magnesium coordination sphere involves the same aspartate along with five water molecules, one of which is shared with the zinc molecule. The reputed role of the metal ions include structure stabilization as well as activation of hydroxide to mediate catalysis.

The domains are separated by "hinge" regions where they can be experimentally separated by limited proteolysis.

The phosphodiesterase 1 isoenzyme family (along with the phosphodiesterase 4 family) is the most diverse one and includes numerous splice variant PDE1 isoforms. It has three subtypes, PDE1A, PDE1B and PDE1C which divide further into various isoforms.

== Localization ==
The localization of PDE1 isoforms in different tissues/cells and their location within the cells is as follows:

| Isoform | Tissue/cellular localization | Intracellular localization |
|---|---|---|
| PDE1A (PDE1A) | Smooth muscle, heart, lung, brain, sperm | Predominantly cytosolic |
| PDE1A1 | Heart, lung | Predominantly cytosolic |
| PDE1A2 | Brain | Predominantly cytosolic |
| PDE1B1 (PDE1B) | Neurons, lymphocytes, smooth muscle brain, heart, skeletal muscle | Cytosolic |
| PDE1B2 | Macrophages, lymphocytes | Cytosolic |
| PDE1C (PDE1C) | Brain, proliferating human smooth muscle, spermatids | Cytosolic |
| PDE1C1 | Brain, heart, testis | - |
| PDE1C2 | Olfactory epithelium | Cytosolic |
| PDE1C4/5 | mRNA is present in the testis | - |

Table 1. Various PDE1s location in tissues and within cells.

Most PDE1 isoforms are reported to be cytosolic. However, there are instances of PDE1s being localized to subcellular regions but little is known about the molecular mechanisms responsible for such localization. It is thought to be likely that the unique N-terminal or C-terminal regions of the various isoforms allow the different proteins to be targeted to specific subcellular domains.

== Functional role ==
Phosphodiesterase1 catalyses the following chemical reaction:

Hydrolytically removes 5′-nucleotides successively from the 3′-hydroxy termini of 3′-hydroxy-terminated oligonucleotides

It hydrolyses both ribonucleotides and deoxyribonucleotides, but it has low activity towards polynucleotides.

Intracellular second messengers such as cGMP and cAMP undergo rapid changes in concentration in a response to a wide variety of cell specific stimuli. The concentration of these second messengers is determined to a large extent by the relative synthetic activity of cyclase and degrative activity of cyclic nucleotide PDE. PDE1 degrades both cGMP and cAMP.

Binding of PDE to cGMP and cAMP, respectively

The various isoforms exhibit different affinities for cAMP and cGMP. PDE1A and PDE1B preferentially hydrolyse cGMP, whereas PDE1C degrades both cAMP and cGMP with high affinity. For example, in airway smooth muscles of humans and other species, generic PDE1 accounts for more than 50% of the hydrolytic activity of cyclic nucleotides. It has been demonstrated that deletion and overexpression of PDE1 produces strong effects on agonist-induced cAMP signalling but has little effect on the basal cAMP level. At cortical and thalamic inputs to the striatum, PDE1 activity regulates neurotransmitter release via cGMP.

=== Pharmacology ===
Because of in vitro regulation by Ca^{2+}/calmodulin, PDE1s are believed to function as a mechanism for integrating cell signalling pathways mediated by cGMP and cAMP with pathways that regulate intracellular calcium levels. The precise function of PDE1 isozymes in various pathophysiological processes is not clear because most of the studies have been carried out in vitro. Therefore, it is essential to direct further research to in vivo studies.

PDE1 has been implicated to play a role in a number of physiological and pathological processes:

- PDE1A most likely serves to regulate vascular smooth muscle concentration and has been found to be up-regulated in rat aorta in response to chronic nitroglycerin treatment. It is also possible that it plays a role in sperm function.
- PDE1B knockout mice have increased locomotor activity and in some paradigms decreased memory and learning abilities. PDE1B is also involved in dopaminergic signalling and is induced in several types of activated immune cells. PDE1B mRNA is induced in PHA or anti-CD3/CD28-activated human T-lymphocytes and participates in IL-13 regulation implicated in allergic diseases.
- PDE1C has been shown to be a major regulator of smooth muscle proliferation, at least in human smooth muscle. Nonproliferating smooth muscle cells (SMC) exhibit only low levels of PDE1C expression but it is highly expressed in proliferating SMCs. It can therefore be speculated that inhibition of PDE1C could produce beneficial effects due to its putative inhibition of SMC proliferation, an event that contributes importantly to the pathophysiology of atherosclerosis. Another likely roles of PDE1C is in olfaction [4], to regulate sperm function and neuronal signaling.

== Regulation ==
The distinguishing feature of PDE1 as a family is their regulation by calcium (Ca^{2+}) and calmodulin (CaM). Calmodulin has been shown to activate cyclic nucleotide PDE in a calcium-dependent manner and the cooperative binding of four Ca^{2+} to calmodulin is required to fully activate PDE1 [2]. The binding of one Ca^{2+}/CaM complex per monomer to binding sites near the N-terminus stimulates hydrolysis of cyclic nucleotides. In intact cells, PDE1 is almost exclusively activated by Ca^{2+} entering the cell from the extracellular space. The regulation of PDE1 by Ca^{2+} and CaM has been studied in vitro and these studies have shown that eight methionine residues within the hydrophobic clefts of Ca^{2+}-CaM are required for the binding and activation of PDE1. Mutations in the N-terminal lobe of CaM affect its ability to activate PDE1 so it is believed that the C-terminal lobe of CaM serves to target CaM to PDE1, while the N-terminal lobe activates the enzyme. The presence of an aromatic residue, usually a tryptophan, in the CaM-binding region of Ca^{2+}-CaM-regulated proteins may also be required for binding to PDE1.

Between different PDE1 isozymes there is a significant difference in affinity for Ca^{2+}/CaM. In general, the PDE1 enzymes have high affinity for the complex but the affinity can be affected by phosphorylation. Phosphorylation of PDE1A1 and PDE1A2 by protein kinase A and of PDE1B1 by CaM Kinase II decreases their sensitivity to calmodulin activation. This phosphorylation can be reversed by the phosphatase, calcineurin. The phosphorylation of the isozymes is accompanied by a decrease in the isozymes affinity towards CaM, as well as an increase in the Ca^{2+} concentrations required for CaM activation of the isozymes.

== Inhibitors and their function ==
PDEs have been pursued as therapeutic targets because of the basic pharmacological principle that regulation of degradation of any ligand or second messenger can often make a more rapid and larger percentage change in concentration than comparable rates of synthesis. Another reason is that PDEs do not have to compete with very high levels of endogenous substrate to be effective since the levels of cAMP and cGMP in most cells are typically in the micromolar range.

The availability of high-resolution crystal structures of the catalytic domains of PDEs makes the development of highly potent and specific inhibitors possible.

Many compounds reported as PDE1 inhibitors do not interact directly with the catalytic site of PDE1 but interact during activation, either at the level of calmodulin binding sites such as compound KS505a or directly on Ca^{2+}/calmodulin such as bepril, flunarizine and amiodarone.

Those inhibitors that interact with the catalytic site occupy part of the active site, primarily around the Q pocket and occasionally close to the M pocket. A major point of interaction is a conserved hydrophobic pocket that is involved in orienting the substrate purine ring for interaction with a glutamine residue that is crucial for the catalytic mechanism of the PDEs.

The interactions of inhibitors can be split into three major types: interactions with the metal ions mediated through water, H-bond interactions with the protein residues involved in nucleotide recognition and most importantly the interaction with the hydrophobic residues lining the cavity of the active site. All known inhibitors seem to exploit these three types of interactions and hence these interactions should guide the design of new types of inhibitors.

Initially PDE1 inhibitors were claimed to be effective vascular relaxants. With availability of purified cloned enzymes, however, it is now known that such inhibitors are in fact equally active against PDE5. Those inhibitors include e.g. zaprinast, 8-methoxymethyl IPMX and SCH 51866.

All therapeutically effective PDE inhibitors must be incorporated into the cell because all PDEs are localized in the cytoplasm and/or on intracellular membranes.

Today, there is no real and effective specific PDE1 inhibitor that can be used to assess the functional role of PDE1 in tissues.

=== Common inhibitors ===
Chemical structure of nimodipine

Chemical structure of vinpocetine

Nimodipine is a dihydropyridine that antagonizes/blocks specifically L-type Ca^{2+}-channel, and was first described as a PDE1 inhibitor. This effect is not related to its calcium antagonist property since it inhibits, in micromolar range, basal and calmodulin stimulated purified PDE1. Since nimodipine at lower concentrations blocks the L-type calcium channel, it can only be used to estimate PDE1 participation in tissue and cell homogenates.

Vinpocetine was described as a specific inhibitor of basal and calmodulin-activated PDE1. This effect leads to an increase of cAMP over cGMP. It is mainly used as a pharmacological tool to implicate PDE1. Vinpocetine inhibits differently the various subtypes of PDE1 (IC_{50} from 8 to 50 μm) and it is also able to inhibit PDE7B. It can not be used as a specific tool to investigate the functional role of PDE1 due to its direct activator effects on BK (Ca) channels. Vinpocetine crosses the blood–brain barrier and is taken up by cerebral tissue. It has been hypothesized that vinpocetine can affect voltage-dependent calcium channels.

IC224 inhibits PDE1 (IC_{50} = 0.08 μM) with a selective ratio of 127 (ratio of IC_{50} value for the next most sensitive PDE and for IC_{50} value for PDE1). It was developed by ICOS corporation. If IC224 similarly inhibits basal and calmodulin-activated PDE1 subtypes, this compound could be very helpful to characterize PDE1 activity and to clearly investigate the various roles of PDE1 in pathophysiology.

== Inhibitors in diseases ==
Nearly all the phosphodiesterases are expressed in the CNS, making this gene family an attractive source of new targets for the treatment of psychiatric and neurodegenerative disorders.

PDE1A2 has a potential role in neurodegenerative diseases, including:

- Parkinson's disease
- Axonal neurofilament degradation
- Motorneuronal degradation
- Neuronal ischemia
- Alzheimer's disease
- Epilepsy

PDE1C could have a role in the regulation of insulin release and may target proliferating smooth muscle cells in atherosclerotic lesions or during restenosis.
