= Butalamine =

Chemical compound

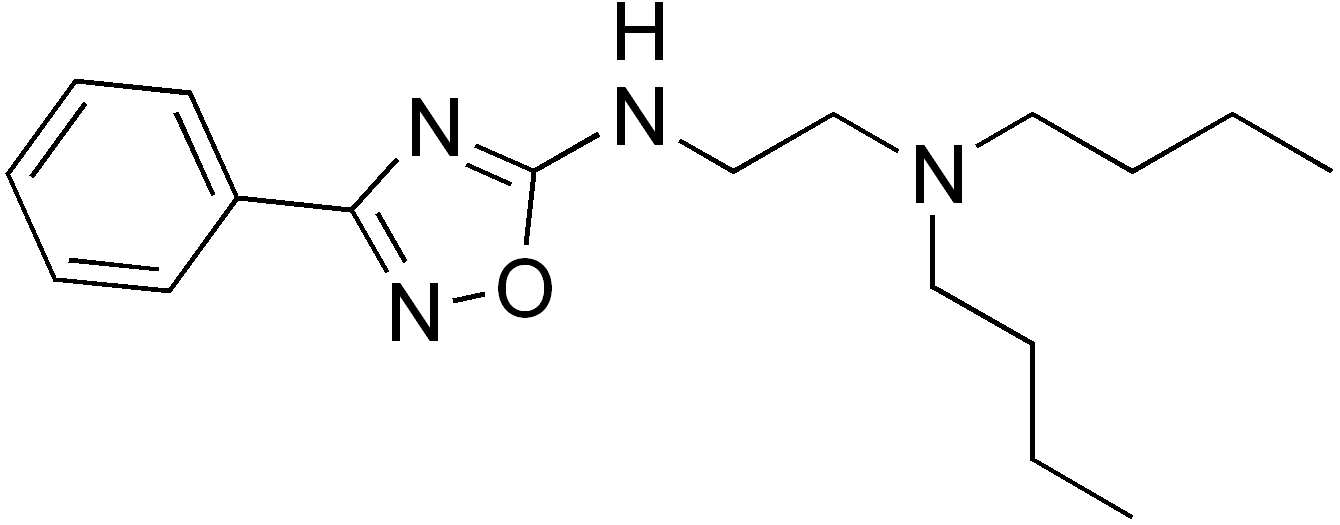

Clinical data
- ATC code: C04AX23 (WHO)

Identifiers
- IUPAC name: N,N-Dibutyl-N'-(3-phenyl-1,2,4-oxadiazol-5-yl)ethane-1,2-diamine
- CAS Number: 22131-35-7
- PubChem CID: 30949
- ChemSpider: 28712
- UNII: 140T9JTG43
- ChEMBL: ChEMBL1697825
- CompTox Dashboard (EPA): DTXSID1022710
- ECHA InfoCard: 100.040.708

Chemical and physical data
- Formula: C_{18}H_{28}N_{4}O
- Molar mass: 316.449 g·mol^{−1}
- 3D model (JSmol): Interactive image
- SMILES: n1c(onc1c2ccccc2)NCCN(CCCC)CCCC

Butalamine is a vasodilator.

== Synthesis ==
The reaction of benzamidoxime (1) with chlorine and subsequent reaction with cyanamide (3) gives 5-amino-3-phenyl-1,2,4-oxadiazole (4). Base catalyzed alkylation with dibutylaminoethyl chloride (5) completes the synthesis of butalamine (6).

Synthesis of butalamine
