= Ear instillation =

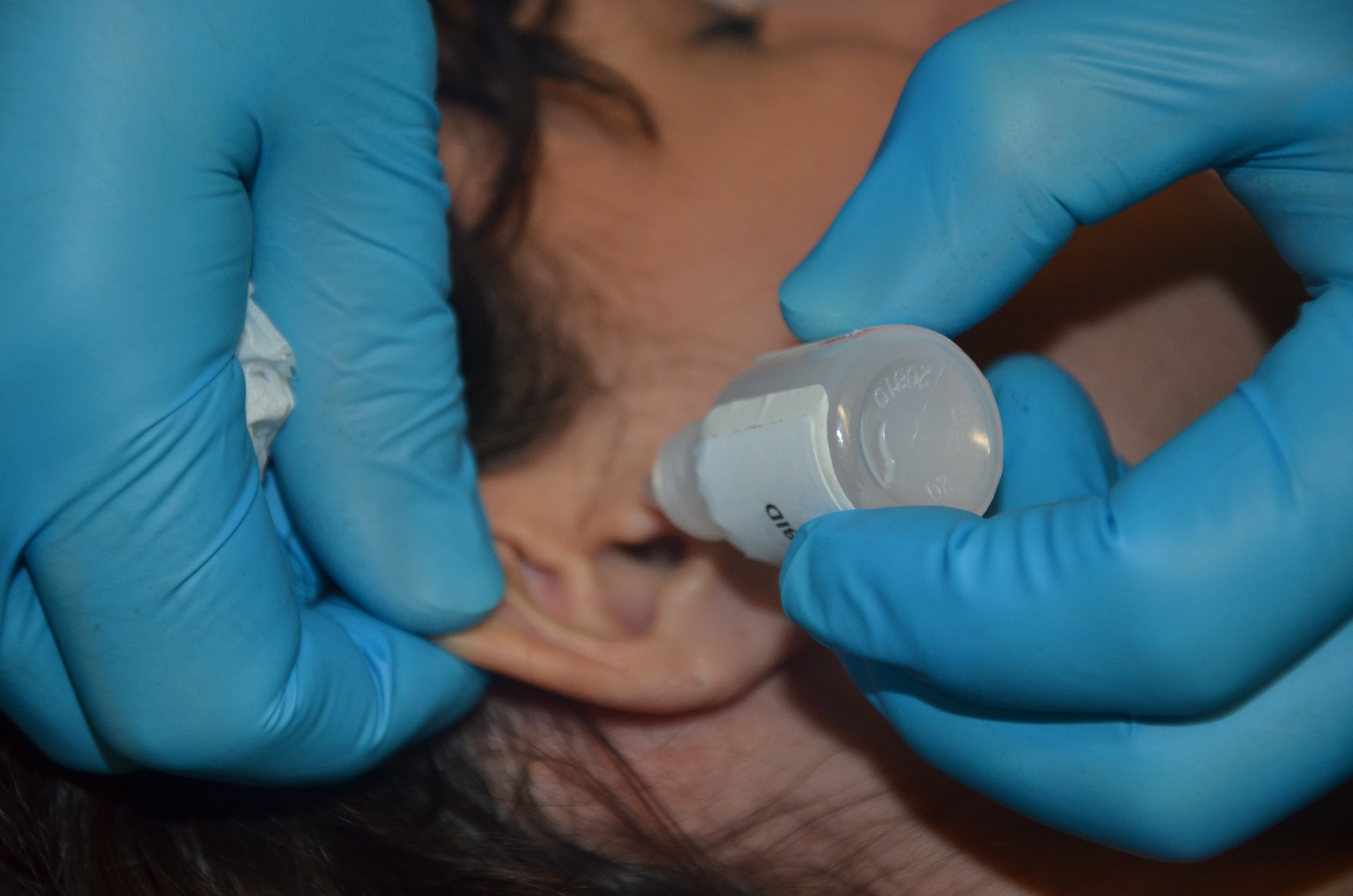
Ear drops are commonly used to treat swimmer's ear.

Ear instillation is the process of introducing otic medication or other liquids into the ear canal. Proper care is needed in delivering such liquids.

== Indications for ear instillation ==
- patients with otitis media
- patients with otitis externa
- patients with impacted cerumen (earwax)
- patients with foreign body obstruction

== Contraindications for ear instillation ==
- hypersensitivity to the solution.
- perforated eardrum
