= Pentifylline =

Chemical compound

Clinical data
- Other names: 1-Hexyltheophylline
- ATC code: C04AD01 (WHO)

Identifiers
- IUPAC name: 1-Hexyl-3,7-dimethyl-3,7-dihydro-1H-purine-2,6-dione
- CAS Number: 1028-33-7
- PubChem CID: 70569
- ChemSpider: 63738
- UNII: MBM1C4K26S
- KEGG: D07174
- CompTox Dashboard (EPA): DTXSID2057609
- ECHA InfoCard: 100.012.584

Chemical and physical data
- Formula: C_{13}H_{20}N_{4}O_{2}
- Molar mass: 264.329 g·mol^{−1}
- 3D model (JSmol): Interactive image
- SMILES: CCCCCCN1C(=O)C2=C(N=CN2C)N(C1=O)C
- InChI: InChI=1S/C13H20N4O2/c1-4-5-6-7-8-17-12(18)10-11(14-9-15(10)2)16(3)13(17)19/h9H,4-8H2,1-3H3; Key:MRWQRJMESRRJJB-UHFFFAOYSA-N

Pentifylline (marketed as Cosaldon) is a vasodilator.
