= Cetiedil =

Chemical compound

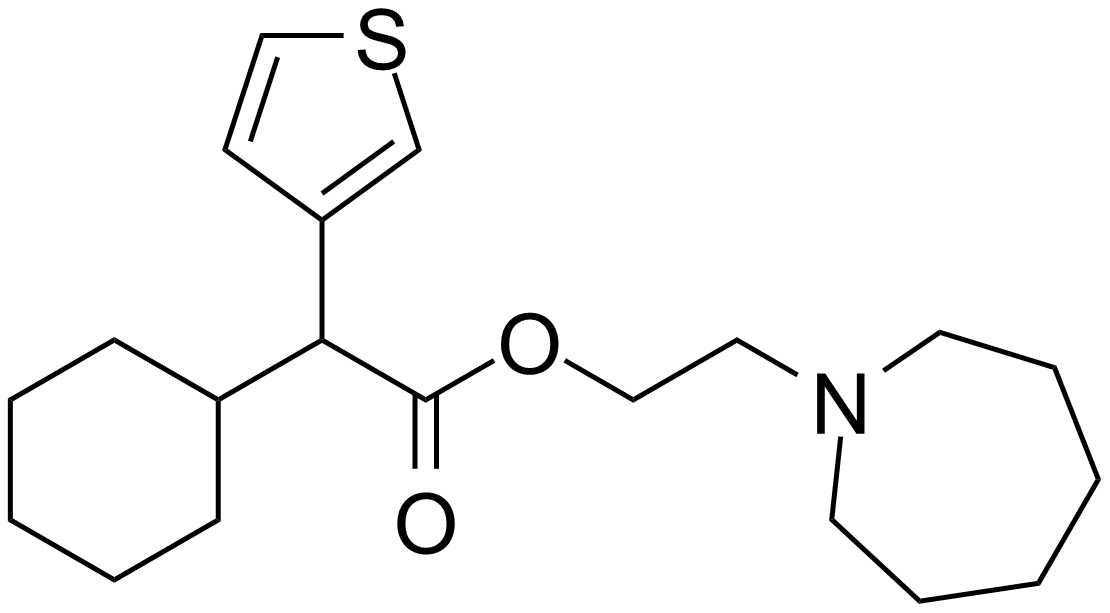

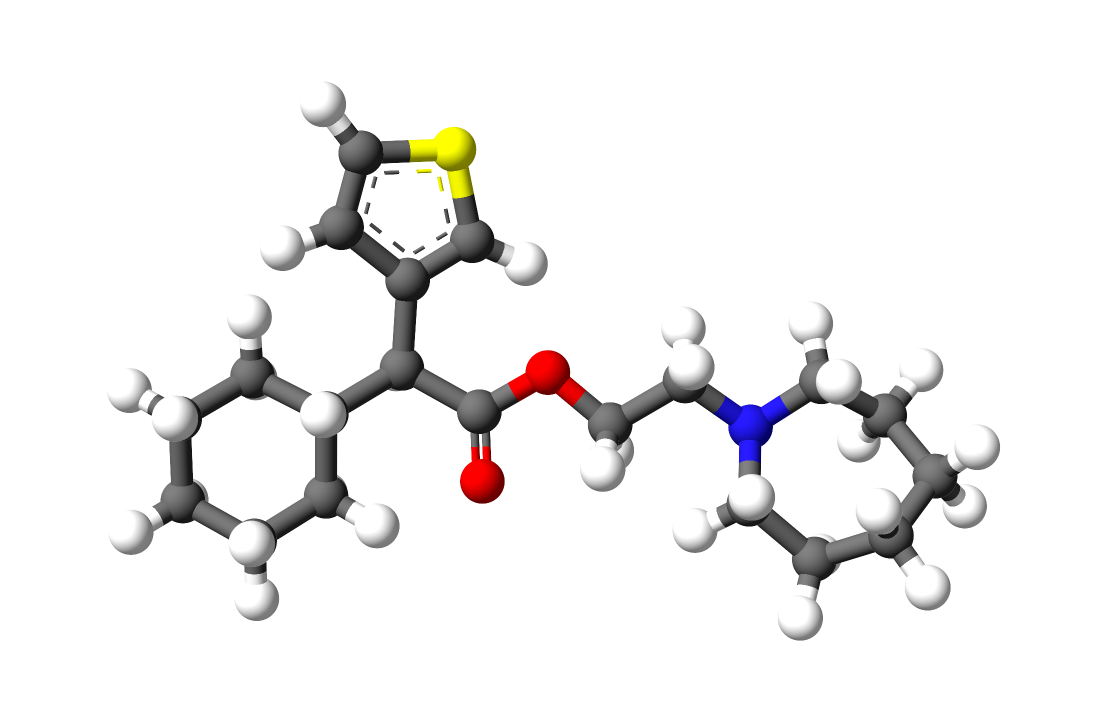

Clinical data
- ATC code: C04AX26 (WHO)

Identifiers
- IUPAC name: 2-(azepan-1-yl)ethyl 2-cyclohexyl-2-(thiophen-3-yl)acetate
- CAS Number: 14176-10-4
- PubChem CID: 66384
- ChemSpider: 59759
- UNII: 621RT200TO
- ChEMBL: ChEMBL419380
- CompTox Dashboard (EPA): DTXSID70864474
- ECHA InfoCard: 100.034.556

Chemical and physical data
- Formula: C_{20}H_{31}NO_{2}S
- Molar mass: 349.53 g·mol^{−1}
- 3D model (JSmol): Interactive image
- SMILES: O=C(OCCN1CCCCCC1)C(c2ccsc2)C3CCCCC3
- InChI: InChI=1S/C20H31NO2S/c22-20(23-14-13-21-11-6-1-2-7-12-21)19(18-10-15-24-16-18)17-8-4-3-5-9-17/h10,15-17,19H,1-9,11-14H2; Key:MMNICIJVQJJHHF-UHFFFAOYSA-N

Cetiedil is a vasodilator and an anti-sickling agent.

== Synthesis ==
Thieme Original patents: Prepn and activity: Revised synthesis: Analogues:

The Clemmensen reduction of 3-thienylcyclohexyl-glycolic acid, CID:11064522 (1) gives cyclohexyl(thiophen-3-yl)acetic acid [16199-74-9] (2). Esterification of the sodium salt of the resulting acid with 1-(2-chloroethyl)azepane [2205-31-4] (3) produces cetiedil (4).
