= Ciprofloxacin/celecoxib =

Combination drug

Combination of
- Ciprofloxacin: Fluoroquinolone antibiotic
- Celecoxib: Cyclooxygenase-2 inhibitor

Clinical data
- Trade names: PrimeC

Legal status
- Legal status: Investigational

PrimeC is a proprietary fixed-dose combination of ciprofloxacin and celecoxib, engineered as a synchronized extended-release, matrix-based formulation that enables optimized and coordinated delivery of both agents, despite their distinct physicochemical and pharmacokinetic properties. Developed by NeuroSense Therapeutics Ltd. for the treatment of ALS, PrimeC is designed to target multiple pathological pathways associated with the disease, including neuroinflammation, iron dysregulation, and miRNA dysregulation, and to reduce pathological TDP-43 accumulation in motor neuron cells.
