= Vinpocetine =

Chemical compound

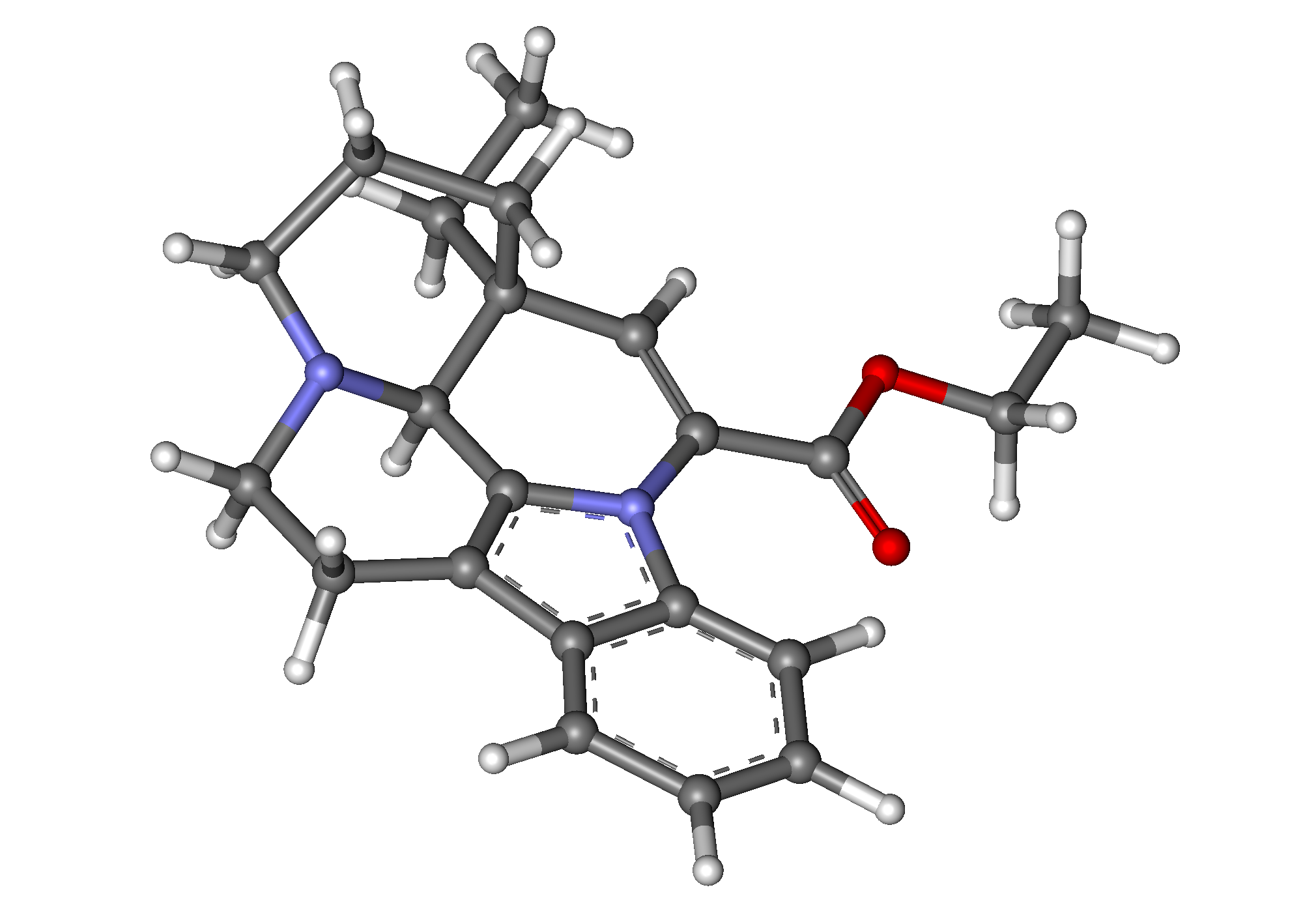

Clinical data
- Trade names: Cavinton, others
- AHFS/Drugs.com: International Drug Names
- Pregnancy category: Not recommended
- Routes of administration: Oral, intravenous
- ATC code: N06BX18 (WHO)

Legal status
- Legal status: US: Unapproved "New Drug" (as defined by 21 U.S. Code § 321(p)(1)). Use in dietary supplements, food, or medicine is unlawful; otherwise uncontrolled.; EU: Rx-only

Pharmacokinetic data
- Bioavailability: 56.6 ± 8.9%
- Metabolism: hepatic
- Elimination half-life: 2.54 ± 0.48 hours
- Excretion: renal

Identifiers
- IUPAC name: (3α,16α)-Eburnamenine-14-carboxylic acid ethyl ester
- CAS Number: 42971-09-5
- PubChem CID: 443955
- IUPHAR/BPS: 5285
- ChemSpider: 392007
- UNII: 543512OBTC
- KEGG: D01371
- ChEMBL: ChEMBL71752
- CompTox Dashboard (EPA): DTXSID5023740
- ECHA InfoCard: 100.050.917

Chemical and physical data
- Formula: C_{22}H_{26}N_{2}O_{2}
- Molar mass: 350.462 g·mol^{−1}
- 3D model (JSmol): Interactive image
- SMILES: O=C(OCC)C=4n1c3c(c2ccccc12)CCN5[C@H]3[C@](C=4)(CCC5)CC
- InChI: InChI=1S/C22H26N2O2/c1-3-22-11-7-12-23-13-10-16-15-8-5-6-9-17(15)24(19(16)20(22)23)18(14-22)21(25)26-4-2/h5-6,8-9,14,20H,3-4,7,10-13H2,1-2H3/t20-,22+/m1/s1; Key:DDNCQMVWWZOMLN-IRLDBZIGSA-N

Vinpocetine (ethyl apovincaminate), sold under the brand name Cavinton among others, is a synthetic derivative of the vinca alkaloid vincamine, differing by the removal of a hydroxyl group and by being the ethyl rather than the methyl ester of the underlying carboxylic acid. Vincamine is extracted from either the seeds of Voacanga africana or the leaves of Vinca minor (lesser periwinkle).

== Medical uses ==
Vinpocetine has been used in many Asian and European countries for treatment of cerebrovascular disorders such as stroke and dementia for over three decades.

The FDA has tentatively ruled that vinpocetine, due to its synthetic nature and proposed therapeutic uses, is ineligible to be marketed as dietary supplement under the Federal Food, Drug, and Cosmetic Act. Despite this, vinpocetine remains widely available in dietary supplements often marketed as nootropics.

Vinpocetine does not fully support a benefit in either dementia or stroke. As of 2003, three controlled clinical trials had tested "older adults with memory problems".

Vinpocetine has also been studied for the prevention and recovery of acquired hearing loss in a phase II, longitudinal and prospective open clinical study on humans.

== Side effects ==
Use during pregnancy may harm the baby or result in miscarriage.

Adverse effects of vinpocetine include flushing, nausea, dizziness, dry mouth, transient hypo- and hyper-tension, headaches, heartburn, and decreased blood pressure. FDA issued a statement in 2019 warning that "vinpocetine may cause a miscarriage or harm fetal development".

== Mechanism of action ==
Vinpocetine's mechanism of action has been postulated to involve three potential effects: blockage of sodium channels, reduction of cellular calcium influx, and antioxidant activity. Studies have also suggested that vinpocetine can inhibit PDE-1 in isolated rabbit aorta; inhibit IKK in vitro, preventing IκB degradation and the following translocation of NF-κB to the cell nucleus; and increase DOPAC, a metabolic breakdown product of dopamine, in isolated striatal nerve endings of rats.

== Dietary supplement ==
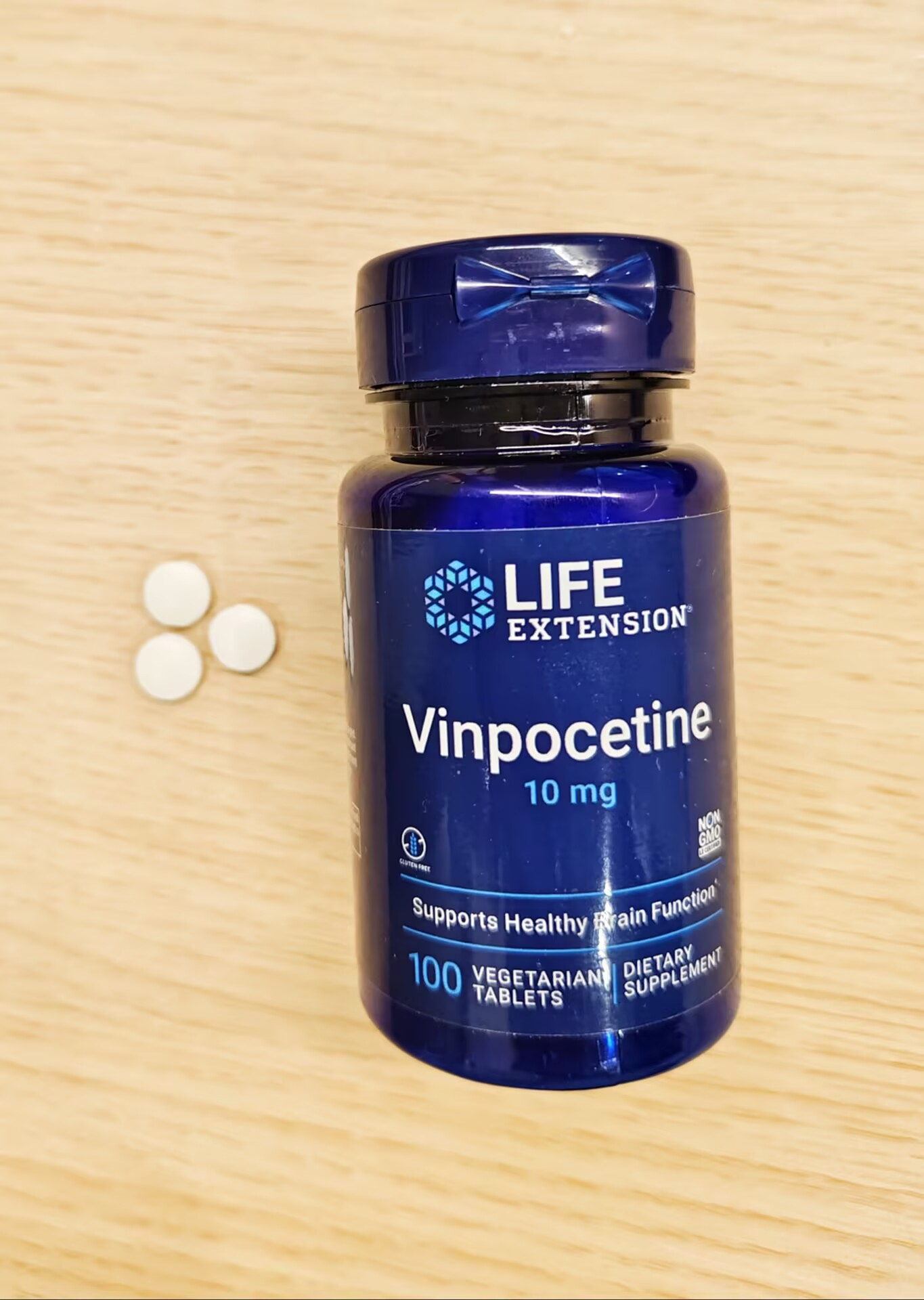
Vinpocetine tablets sold by the supplement company Life Extension, 10mg per tablet

The inclusion of vinpocetine in dietary supplements in the U.S. has come under scrutiny due to the lack of defined dosage parameters, unproven short- and long-term benefits, and risks to human health. In the U.S., vinpocetine supplements are marketed as sports supplements, brain enhancers, and weight loss supplements.

A 2015 analysis of 23 brands of vinpocetine dietary supplements sold at GNC and Vitamin Shoppe retail stores reported widespread labeling errors. Only 6 of the 23 supplement labels (26%) provided consumers with accurate dosages of vinpocetine (ranging from 0.3 to 32 mg per recommended daily serving), while 6 of 23 (26%) contained no vinpocetine at all, despite their labels claiming that the ingredient was in them. In total, 9 of the 23 products tested were mislabeled, and 17 of 23 (74%) did not provide any information on the quantity of vinpocetine.

In response to the study, then-senator Claire McCaskill, while at the time serving as the top Democrat on the Senate Special Committee on Aging, urged the FDA to suspend sales of vinpocetine supplements and asked 10 retailers to voluntarily stop selling vinpocetine products. McCaskill stated: "The way we regulate these supplements isn't working—and it's putting the lives and well-being of consumers at risk. We've seen products with false labels, tainted ingredients, wildly illegal claims, and, now, products containing synthesized ingredients that are classified as prescription drugs in other countries."

=== Lawsuits ===
Procera AVH is a dietary supplement containing undisclosed amounts of vinpocetine in combination with huperzine A and acetyl-l-carnitine. In 2012, manufacturer Brain Research Labs (BRL) agreed to pay $500,000 to settle a class action lawsuit which alleged that the company had falsely marketed Procera AVH as capable of improving brain function, in violation of the Consumer Fraud Act.

In July 2015, the U.S. Federal Trade Commission (FTC) ruled that marketing claims for Procera AVH, which promoted the product as a "solution" to memory loss and cognitive decline, were false, misleading, unsubstantiated, and in violation of the FTC Act. BRL and its affiliated companies Brain Power Partners, Brain Power Founders, and MedHealth Direct (all based in Laguna Beach, California) were fined $91 million. KeyView Labs, the Tampa, Florida-based company that purchased BRL in 2012, was fined $61 million. Also named in the FTC complaint were George Reynolds (aka Josh Reynolds), founder and chief science officer of BRL, and John Arnold, the sole officer and employee of MedHealth. The FTC complaint charged Reynolds with making deceptive expert endorsements for Procera AVH. The defendants in the case ultimately agreed to pay $1.4 million to settle the allegations of deceptive advertising brought by the FTC and California law enforcement officials. In addition, a permanent injunction barred the defendants from making similar deceptive claims about Procera AVH in the future and from misrepresenting the existence, results, or conclusions of any scientific study.
