= Suloctidil =

Chemical compound

Clinical data
- ATC code: C04AX19 (WHO)

Identifiers
- IUPAC name: 1-[4-(isopropylthio)phenyl]-2-(octylamino)propan-1-ol
- CAS Number: 54767-75-8
- PubChem CID: 5354
- ChemSpider: 571402
- UNII: XV1N1XY17K
- ChEBI: CHEBI:233445
- ChEMBL: ChEMBL588119
- CompTox Dashboard (EPA): DTXSID701017974 DTXSID4045638, DTXSID701017974
- ECHA InfoCard: 100.053.920

Chemical and physical data
- Formula: C_{20}H_{35}NOS
- Molar mass: 337.57 g·mol^{−1}
- 3D model (JSmol): Interactive image
- SMILES: CCCCCCCCNC(C)C(C1=CC=C(C=C1)SC(C)C)O
- InChI: InChI=1S/C20H35NOS/c1-5-6-7-8-9-10-15-21-17(4)20(22)18-11-13-19(14-12-18)23-16(2)3/h11-14,16-17,20-22H,5-10,15H2,1-4H3; Key:BFCDFTHTSVTWOG-UHFFFAOYSA-N

Suloctidil was a sulfur-containing aminoalcohol that was brought to market in the early 1970s as a vasodilator by Continental Pharma, a Belgian company.

Continental was bought by Monsanto in 1984, primarily on the promise of sales of suloctidil, which was approved in Europe at the time, but not in the US. However, in 1985 Monsanto halted development and withdrew the drug worldwide following reports of liver toxicity.
