= Bamethan =

Chemical compound

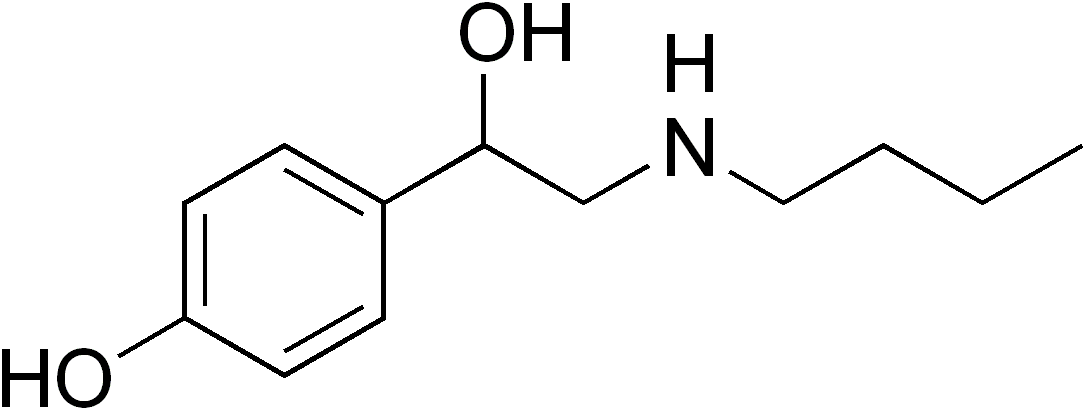

Clinical data
- AHFS/Drugs.com: International Drug Names
- ATC code: C04AA31 (WHO)

Legal status
- Legal status: AU: S4 (Prescription only)

Identifiers
- IUPAC name: 1-(p-hydroxyphenol)-2-butylamino-1-ethanol
- CAS Number: 3703-79-5
- PubChem CID: 2292
- ChemSpider: 2204
- UNII: Y08ZFJ9TFK
- ChEMBL: ChEMBL1987462
- CompTox Dashboard (EPA): DTXSID5046144
- ECHA InfoCard: 100.020.949

Chemical and physical data
- Formula: C_{12}H_{19}NO_{2}
- Molar mass: 209.289 g·mol^{−1}
- 3D model (JSmol): Interactive image
- SMILES: OC(c1ccc(O)cc1)CNCCCC
- InChI: InChI=1S/C12H19NO2/c1-2-3-8-13-9-12(15)10-4-6-11(14)7-5-10/h4-7,12-15H,2-3,8-9H2,1H3; Key:RDUHXGIIUDVSHR-UHFFFAOYSA-N

Bamethan is a vasodilator.
