= Ciprofloxacin/dexamethasone =

Pharmaceutical product

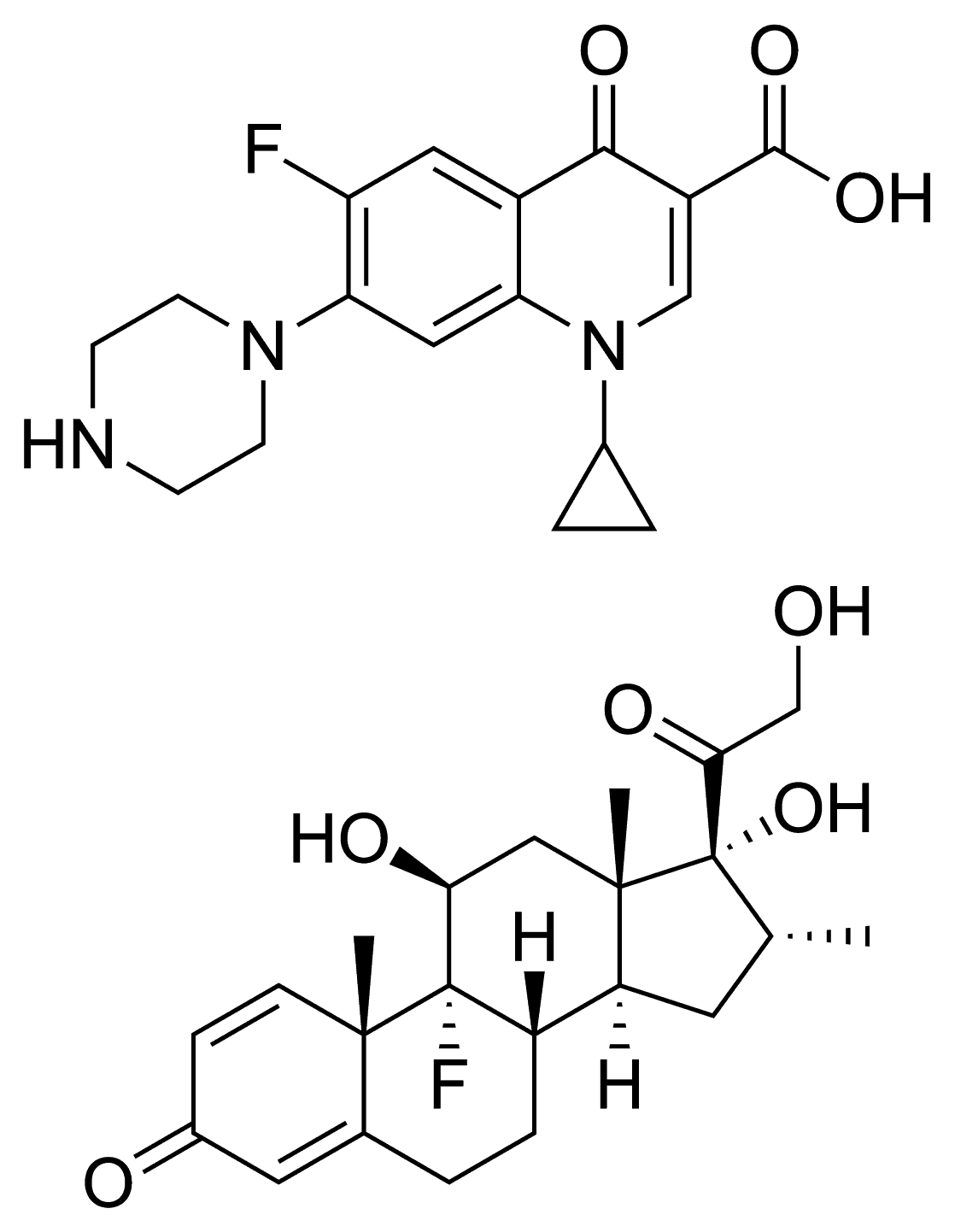

Combination of
- Ciprofloxacin: Fluoroquinolone antibacterial
- Dexamethasone: Corticosteroid

Clinical data
- Trade names: Ciprodex
- AHFS/Drugs.com: Professional Drug Facts
- MedlinePlus: a607010
- Routes of administration: Auricular
- ATC code: S02CA06 (WHO)

Legal status
- Legal status: US: ℞-only; EU: Rx-only

Identifiers
- CAS Number: 130244-48-3
- KEGG: D10296

Ciprofloxacin/dexamethasone, sold under the brand name Ciprodex among others, is an antibiotic/steroid fixed-dose combination medication used for the treatment of ear infections. It contains ciprofloxacin, as the hydrochloride, a fluoroquinolone antibacterial; and dexamethasone, a corticosteroid. It is used as ear drops.

Ciprofloxacin, a fluoroquinolone antibiotic, has shown in vitro activity against many Gram-positive and Gram-negative bacteria including Staphylococcus aureus, Streptococcus pneumoniae, Haemophilus influenzae, Moraxella catarrhalis, and Pseudomonas aeruginosa. Dexamethasone acts as an anti-inflammatory corticosteroid. In 2023, it was the 283rd most commonly prescribed medication in the United States, with more than 700,000 prescriptions.

== Medical uses ==
Ciprofloxacin/dexamethasone is indicated for use in the treatment of acute otitis media and acute otitis externa (swimmer's ear) in people aged six months of age and older.

== Mechanism of action ==
Ciprofloxacin functions as a bactericide by interfering with DNA gyrase, an enzyme with a key role in the synthesis of bacterial DNA. Dexamethasone is used in combination in order to aid in the reducing inflammatory responses that often accompany bacterial infection.

== Clinical trials ==
In clinical trials, the median time to cessation of ear pain in ciprofloxacin/dexamethasone was five days in a sample population of 909 participants. However, the clinical trial failed to demonstrate any significant benefit of using the combination of active ingredients in ciprofloxacin/dexamethasone over ciprofloxacin alone, in regards to ear pain. Ciprofloxacin/dexamethasone was superior to ciprofloxacin in regards to time to cessation of otorrhea.

=== Phase I ===
The most reported adverse effects of phase I studies included headache, rhinitis, pain, dyspepsia, and dysmenorrhea. Investigators did not believe that any of these were directly treatment-related, as many of these events are considered symptoms or manifestations of the underlying illness.

=== Phase II and III ===
Treatment-related adverse effects in AOE studies were determined in phase II and III trials. This includes ear pruritus, ear debris, superimposed ear infection, ear congestion, ear pain, and erythema. Similar effects were demonstrated in AOMT studies. Overall, ciprofloxacin/dexamethasone was determined as a safe and well-tolerated drug for the treatment of AOE and AOMT. The proposed dosage for all patients was also effective and safe. Cure rates for pediatrics were slightly higher than adults in AOE studies.

== Drug interactions ==
Drug interactions have not been studied with ciprofloxacin/dexamethasone.

== Commercialization ==
Ciprofloxacin/dexamethasone, owned by Alcon Laboratories, Inc., is protected by multiple patents and will be restricted from generic manufacturing until 2025.

In October 2015, Alcon sued Dr. Reddy's Laboratories (DLR) for allegedly infringing on patents for the combination. A judge in the UK upheld the Alcon patent.
