= Moxisylyte =

Chemical compound

Clinical data
- Other names: Thymoxamine
- AHFS/Drugs.com: International Drug Names
- ATC code: G04BE06 (WHO) C04AX10 (WHO)

Identifiers
- IUPAC name: 4-[2-(Dimethylamino)ethoxy]-5-isopropyl-2-methylphenyl acetate
- CAS Number: 54-32-0
- PubChem CID: 4260
- DrugBank: DB09205
- ChemSpider: 4110
- UNII: PW8QYA7KI0
- KEGG: D08239
- CompTox Dashboard (EPA): DTXSID4023339
- ECHA InfoCard: 100.000.186

Chemical and physical data
- Formula: C_{16}H_{25}NO_{3}
- Molar mass: 279.380 g·mol^{−1}
- 3D model (JSmol): Interactive image
- SMILES: CC1=CC(=C(C=C1OC(=O)C)C(C)C)OCCN(C)C
- InChI: InChI=1S/C16H25NO3/c1-11(2)14-10-15(20-13(4)18)12(3)9-16(14)19-8-7-17(5)6/h9-11H,7-8H2,1-6H3; Key:VRYMTAVOXVTQEF-UHFFFAOYSA-N

Moxisylyte, also known as thymoxamine, is a drug used in urology for the treatment of erectile dysfunction. It is an α_{1}-adrenergic antagonist. In the United Kingdom, Moxisylyte is marketed as Opilon (Archimedes Pharma UK Ltd) and is used for the short-term treatment of primary Raynaud's syndrome. This is a condition where the fingers and toes become discoloured and is triggered by responses to cold, or emotional distress. Opilon tablets help by improving blood circulation to the extremities.
