= Cinepazic acid =

Names
- Preferred IUPAC name {4-[(2E)-3-(3,4,5-Trimethoxyphenyl)prop-2-enoyl]piperazin-1-yl}acetic acid

Identifiers
CAS Number	54063-23-9
3D model (JSmol)	Interactive image
ChEMBL	ChEMBL2104437
ChemSpider	4947761
PubChem CID	6443799
UNII	OX0J88C7UX
- InChI: InChI=1S/C18H24N2O6/c1-24-14-10-13(11-15(25-2)18(14)26-3)4-5-16(21)20-8-6-19(7-9-20)12-17(22)23/h4-5,10-11H,6-9,12H2,1-3H3,(H,22,23)/b5-4+ Key: XDCDHIJFRRLVST-SNAWJCMRSA-N
- SMILES: COC1=CC(=CC(=C1OC)OC)C=CC(=O)N2CCN(CC2)CC(=O)O

Properties
Chemical formula	C_{18}H_{24}N_{2}O_{6}
Molar mass	364.398 g·mol^{−1}
- Except where otherwise noted, data are given for materials in their standard state (at 25 °C [77 °F], 100 kPa). Infobox references

Cinepazic acid is a cinnamoyl-piperazine compound. Its derivatives include the vasodilators cinepazide and cinepazet.
