= Etofylline nicotinate =

Chemical compound

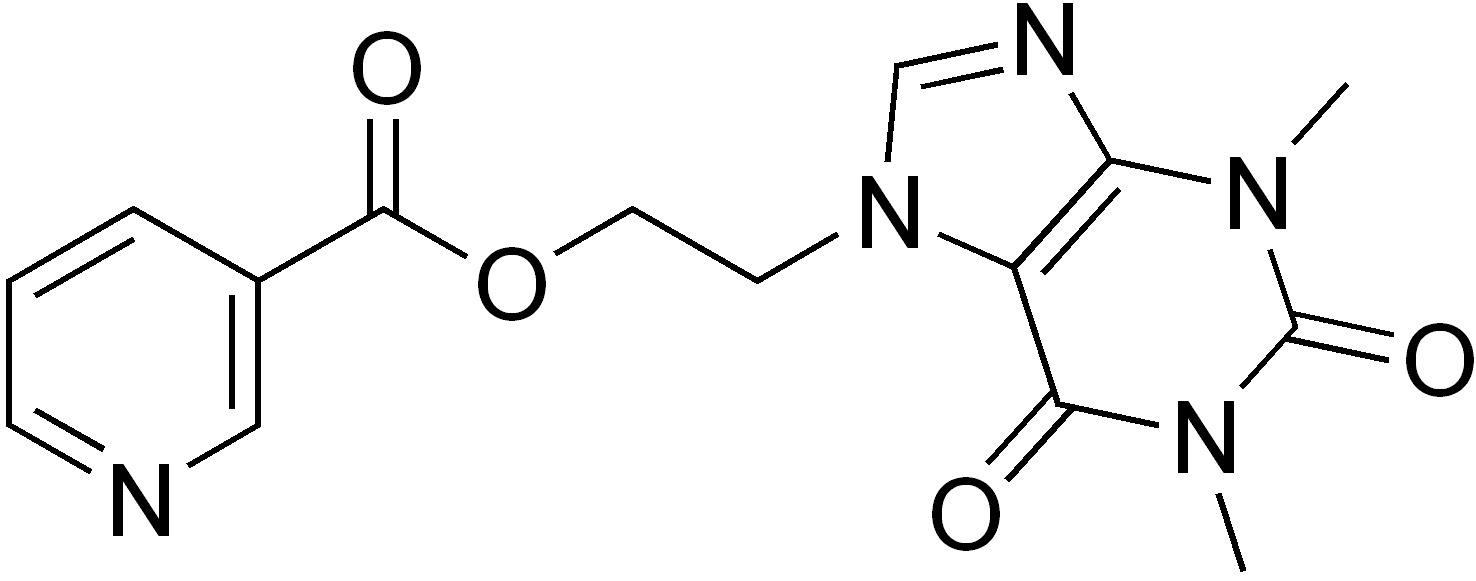

Clinical data
- ATC code: C04AD04 (WHO)

Identifiers
- IUPAC name: 2-(1,3-Dimethyl-2,6-dioxopurin-7-yl)ethyl pyridine-3-carboxylate
- CAS Number: 13425-39-3
- PubChem CID: 83435
- ChemSpider: 75285
- UNII: SN6D1V68DL
- CompTox Dashboard (EPA): DTXSID30158609
- ECHA InfoCard: 100.033.208

Chemical and physical data
- Formula: C_{15}H_{15}N_{5}O_{4}
- Molar mass: 329.316 g·mol^{−1}
- 3D model (JSmol): Interactive image
- SMILES: Cn1c2c(c(=O)n(c1=O)C)n(cn2)CCOC(=O)c3cccnc3
- InChI: InChI=1S/C15H15N5O4/c1-18-12-11(13(21)19(2)15(18)23)20(9-17-12)6-7-24-14(22)10-4-3-5-16-8-10/h3-5,8-9H,6-7H2,1-2H3; Key:ZWIAODBBEZGVPY-UHFFFAOYSA-N

Etofylline nicotinate is a vasodilator.
