= Berefrine =

Sympathomimetic and mydriatic agent

Clinical data
- Other names: Burefrine; Phenylephrine oxazolidine; Phenylephrine oxazolidine prodrug
- ATC code: None

Identifiers
- IUPAC name: 3-[(5R)-3-Methyl-2-(2-methyl-2-propanyl)-1,3-oxazolidin-5-yl]phenol
- CAS Number: 105567-83-7
- PubChem CID: 60017
- ChemSpider: 16736820
- UNII: 378U019DHG
- KEGG: D03097
- ChEMBL: ChEMBL2104659

Chemical and physical data
- Formula: C_{14}H_{21}NO_{2}
- Molar mass: 235.327 g·mol^{−1}
- 3D model (JSmol): Interactive image
- SMILES: CC(C)(C)C1N(C[C@H](O1)c2cccc(c2)O)C
- InChI: InChI=1S/C14H21NO2/c1-14(2,3)13-15(4)9-12(17-13)10-6-5-7-11(16)8-10/h5-8,12-13,16H,9H2,1-4H3/t12-,13?/m0/s1; Key:ORIOFGXXYYXLNY-UEWDXFNNSA-N

Berefrine (INN, USAN), also known as burefrine, is a sympathomimetic and mydriatic medication that was never marketed. It is described as an oxazolidine prodrug of phenylephrine and hence would act as a selective α_{1}-adrenergic receptor agonist.

== See also ==
- Ciclafrine
