= Cyclandelate =

Chemical compound

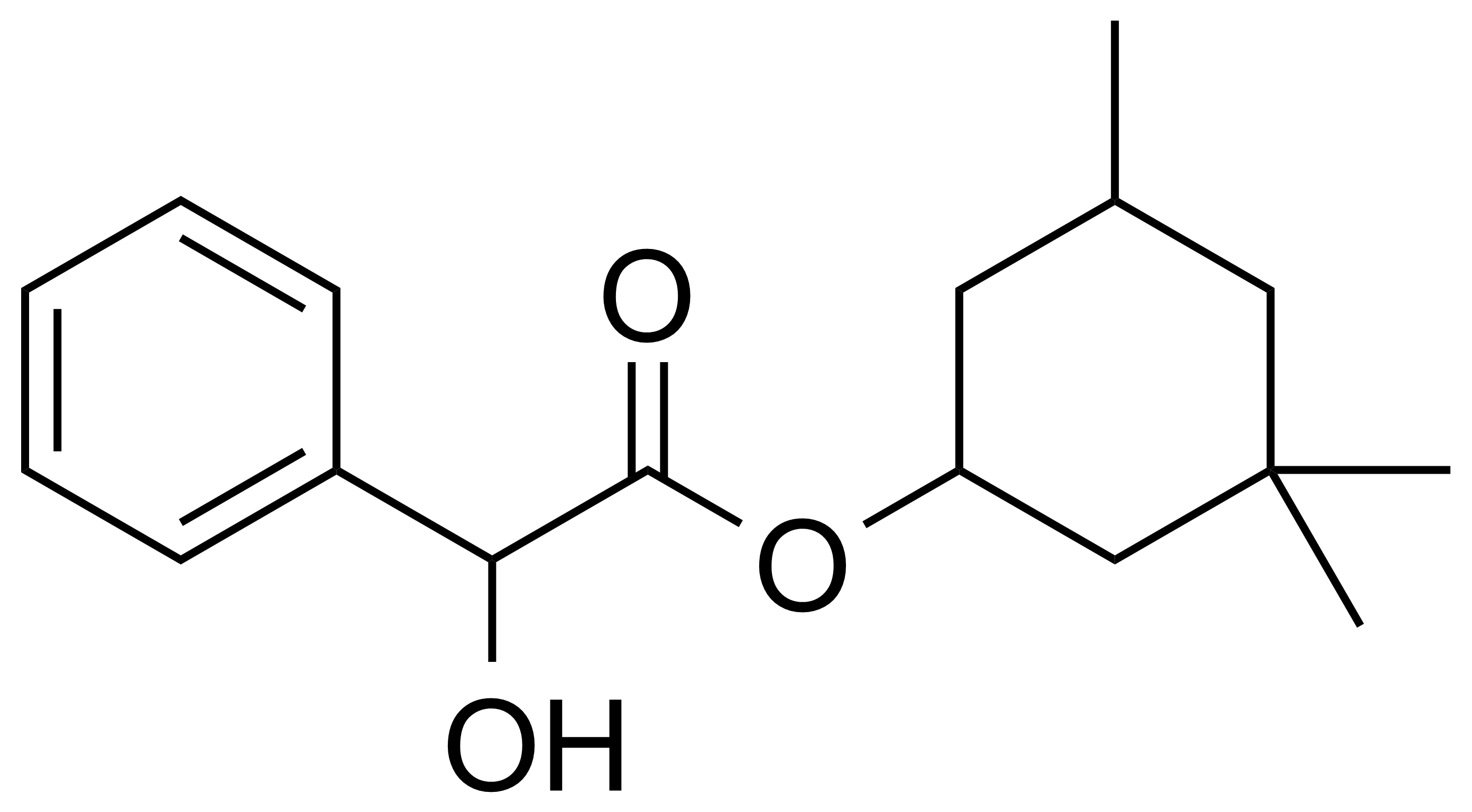

Clinical data
- AHFS/Drugs.com: Micromedex Detailed Consumer Information
- ATC code: C04AX01 (WHO)

Identifiers
- IUPAC name: 3,3,5-trimethylcyclohexyl hydroxy(phenyl)acetate
- CAS Number: 456-59-7
- PubChem CID: 2893
- DrugBank: DB04838
- ChemSpider: 2790
- UNII: 4139O1OAY2
- KEGG: D00286
- ChEBI: CHEBI:3988
- ChEMBL: ChEMBL1480987
- CompTox Dashboard (EPA): DTXSID4022862
- ECHA InfoCard: 100.006.611

Chemical and physical data
- Formula: C_{17}H_{24}O_{3}
- Molar mass: 276.376 g·mol^{−1}
- 3D model (JSmol): Interactive image
- Melting point: 55 to 56.5 °C (131.0 to 133.7 °F)
- Boiling point: 192 to 194 °C (378 to 381 °F) (14 mmHg)
- SMILES: O=C(OC1CC(CC(C1)(C)C)C)C(O)c2ccccc2
- InChI: InChI=1S/C17H24O3/c1-12-9-14(11-17(2,3)10-12)20-16(19)15(18)13-7-5-4-6-8-13/h4-8,12,14-15,18H,9-11H2,1-3H3; Key:WZHCOOQXZCIUNC-UHFFFAOYSA-N

Cyclandelate is a vasodilator used in the treatment of claudication, arteriosclerosis and Raynaud's disease. It is also used to treat nighttime leg cramps, and has been investigated for its effect against migraine. It is orally administered.
