= Ear drop =

Form of medication placed in ears

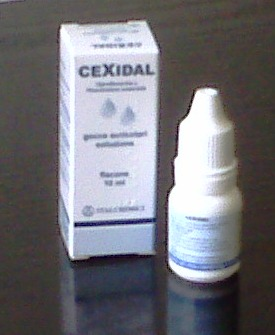
Antibiotic ear drop

Ear drops are a form of topical medication for the ears used to treat infection, inflammation, impacted ear wax and local anesthesia. They are commonly used for short-term treatment and can be purchased with or without a prescription.

== Administration and usage ==
Prior to using the medication, refer to package label for specific instructions or ask a local pharmacist. Check to make sure a tamper-evident seal is intact and the medication is not expired. Let a health care provider know of any drug allergies to any medications or other ingredients in the medication. Let a healthcare provider know what was prescribed and what over the counter medications, vitamins, supplements, and herbal supplements are being taken with this medication. If pregnant, planning to become pregnant, or breastfeeding, make sure to inform a healthcare before using any medications.

Always wash hands with soap and water for 30 seconds prior to administering ear drops and after administering.

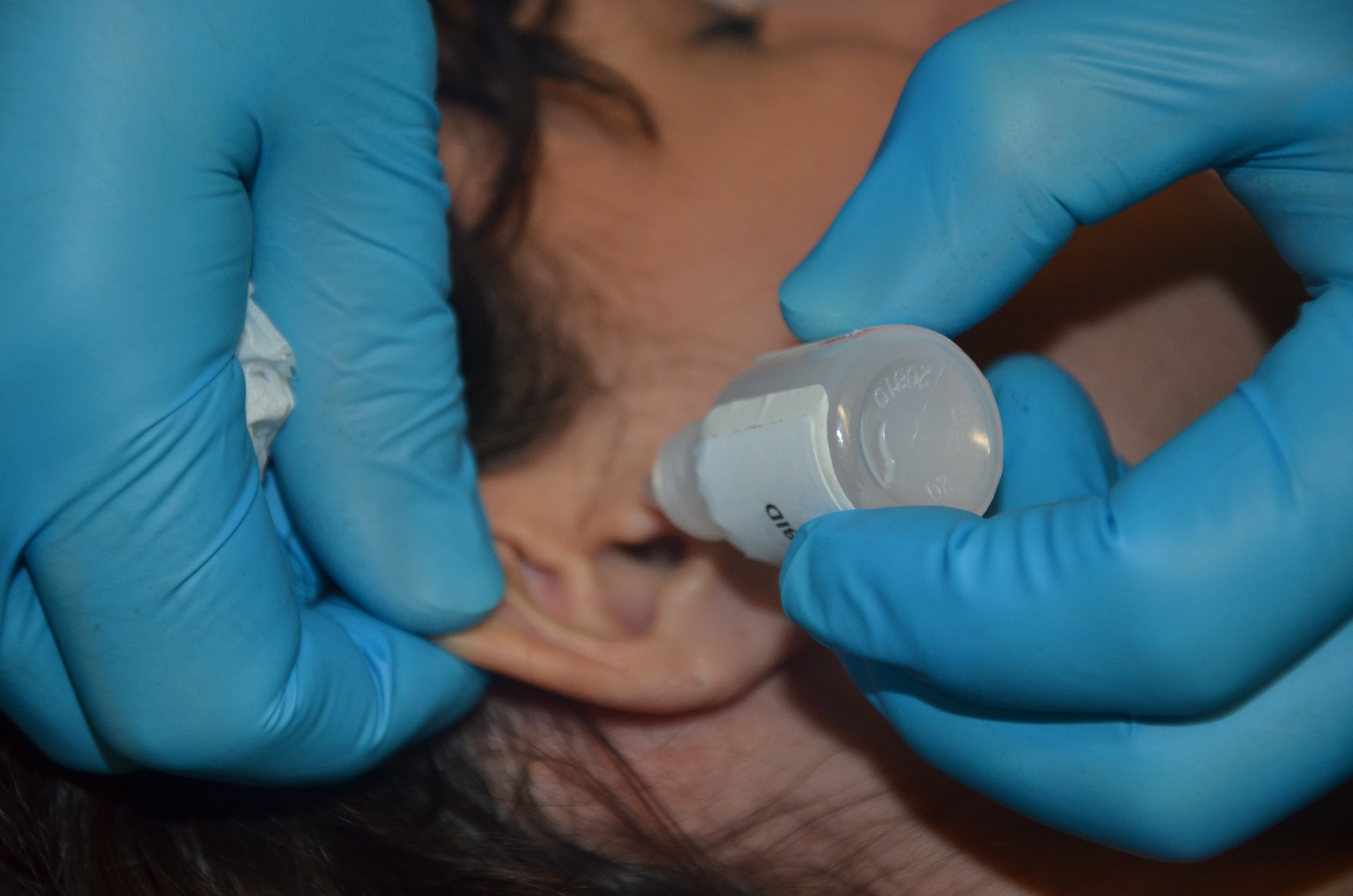
Person administering ear drops

For adults and teenagers:

1. Place a clean folded towel on a stable counter top.
2. Warm the medication if necessary by rolling the medication bottle between the palms.
3. Lay the head on the towel with infected ear facing up.
4. To straighten the ear canal, gently pull the upper ear back and up.
5. Gently shake the medication if instructed. Administer the medication into infected ear.
6. Gently push the tragus (ear flap) to help move the medication deeper into ear canal.
7. Keep the head down for at least one minute.
8. Repeat with other ear if necessary.

For children under 3:

1. Follow the steps for adults and teenagers, however, in step 4, gently pull the earlobe back and down to straighten the ear canal.

For children 3 and over:

1. Follow the steps for adults and teenagers.

Eye drops can generally be used safely in the ears, but ear drops should never be used in the eyes. Prescribers must specifically indicate the use of eye drops for ear drops on the prescription; do not make this substitution without consulting a medical provider.

== Side effects ==
Side effects from using ear drops used to remove ear wax are uncommon, but may result in discomfort, irritation, or pain. Antibiotic ear drops may cause ear discomfort, pain, or itching. When cold ear drops are used, it may cause brief but severe dizziness and/or vertigo.

== Precautions ==
- Ear drops should not be shared to prevent the spread of infection.
- Ear drops should not be used after the expiration date.
- Ear drops should only be used in the affected ear.
- Ear drops are usually used for a short duration of time. Make sure to only use it as prescribed.
- Cotton buds should not be used to clean the inside of the ear since this can cause inflammation and make things worse.
- Ear drops should not be used for a ruptured eardrum (a hole or tear in the eardrum), unless instructed by a medical provider.

== Missed dose ==
If a dose is missed, do not double up at the next administration to catch up and the dose can be administered when recalled. Additionally if it is close to the next dose, skip that missed dose and resume as normal.

== Shelf life ==
Although ear drops typically contain preservatives that slow the growth of bacteria and other microorganisms, this does not offer long term protection from contamination. The shelf life of ear drops varies with products generally needing to be discarded within 4 weeks after opening. With proper use and storage, ear drops should remain effective and safe until the expiration date printed in the medication package insert.

== Uses and common types of ear drops ==
=== Break up earwax ===
Ear wax, also known as cerumen, protects the ear from dust, bacteria, and small objects from entering and damaging the ear. It also provides a coating to protect the skin inside the ear canal from irritation from water during showers and water activities.

However, some individuals have more active glands which can produce more ear wax. This can lead to a build-up that blocks the ear canal, causing in the affected ear temporary hearing loss, auditory sensations, a sensation of the ear being plugged and full, and earache. The excess ear wax may also harden, resulting in an impaction and causing increased discomfort. Healthcare providers recommend against using tools such as cotton swabs or tweezers to reach into an affected ear in an attempt to clean it out, because doing so can have the opposite effect, pushing the ear wax even deeper into the ear canal.

Drops to safely break up earwax are available over-the-counter and are labeled as 'otic' drops. Products in this category contain carbamide peroxide, which dissolves some of the earwax. Some common brands include Auro and Debrox. When carbamide peroxide ear drops are applied to the ear canal, the patient may hear fizzing and feel a tickling sensation as a result of the resulting reaction with the earwax. Drops should be used according to the package instructions (typically recommended for a maximum of 4 days) or as directed by a healthcare provider. If the blockage has worsened or not improved, a doctor should be consulted.

Another method to break up earwax is by using body temperature water. While having the head upright, straighten the ear canal by gently pulling the upper outer ear back and up. Then use a syringe (do not use jet irrigator that is designed for teeth cleaning) to aim a small gentle stream of water at the ear canal wall next to the ear wax to be removed. Next, tilt the head to allow water to drain and repeat if necessary. After removing the ear wax, allow the ear to dry thoroughly. Adding a few drops of alcohol in the ear may help to dry the ear.

Person with otitis externa

Do not use irrigation or ear drops if there is a hole in the ear drum or had recent ear surgery to prevent damage or infection in the ears.

=== Prevent or treat otitis externa ===
Otitis externa, also known as swimmer's ear, is an inflammation (infectious or non-infectious) of the external auditory canal. Risk factors include retained water in the outer ear, particularly due to swimming, humidity, trauma or external devices, dermatologic conditions, or scratching the ear canal that may lead to bacterial growth.

Otitis externa can generally be prevented by keeping the ear canal dry and/or applying ear drops labeled for swimmer's ear (typically a dilution of isopropyl and glycerin) after exposure to water to assist with keeping the ear canal dry.

Treatment of otitis externa is centered around antibiotic ear drops and pain control (e.g. acetaminophen, non-steroidal anti-inflammatory drugs, and opioids including oxycodone or hydrocodone). Antibiotic ear drops are generally safe and well-tolerated. Some studies have demonstrated that the addition of topical steroids to antibiotic ear drops provides quicker pain relief, but these results are conflicting. Symptoms of uncomplicated otitis externa typically improve within 48 hours of initiating antibiotics. If pain does not improve within 48 to 72 hours of antibiotic therapy, individuals should consult their provider to confirm the diagnosis. Common antibiotic ear drops for treating otitis externa include:

- Polymyxin B, neomycin and hydrocortisone; apply 3-4 drops to the affected ear 4 times daily
- Ofloxacin; apply 5 drops to the affected ear twice daily
- Ciprofloxacin with hydrocortisone; apply 3 drops to the affected ear twice daily

=== Antibiotics to treat bacterial infections ===
Bacterial ear infections are treated with antibiotics; local administration is preferred over systemic delivery due to increased antibiotic concentration and lack of systemic side effects. Antibiotic ear drops are much faster at killing the bacteria. Ear drops work faster since the medication directly goes to the site of infection whereas oral antibiotics enter the bloodstream first. Some commonly used antibiotics include:

- Ciprodex ear drops containing ciprofloxacin and dexamethasone
- Ciproxin HC ear drops containing ciprofloxacin and hydrocortisone
- Kenacomb ear drops, containing triamcinolone acetonide, neomycin and gramicidin (antibiotics) and nystatin (antifungal)
- Sofradex ear drops containing neomycin and gramicidin (antibiotics) plus dexamethasone (a steroid)

Antibiotics for ear infections are prescribed for infections that are recurrent or difficult for the body to clear. Antibiotic ear drops should be used as prescribed. Do not stop the use of medication even if the infection appears cleared because remaining bacteria can cause the infection to return.

=== Analgesic and anesthetics to help relieve ear pain ===
Otic analgestic-anesthetic are drops that can help alleviate swelling, pain and congestion caused by middle ear inflammation. However, these ear drops do not treat the infections because they do not contain any antibiotic properties. A common over-the-counter product sold as Auralgan contained antipyrine (analgesic) and benzocaine (anesthetic). It was prescribed alone or with an antibiotic ear drop to help manage an ear infection. However, Auralgran was reformulated without meeting the FDA requirements to be reapproved and was removed from the market on July 2, 2015.

There is some literature to suggest that anesthetic ear drops helped with acute pain. This study was conducted in Australia in 2008 in a hospital emergency room. It included 63 children who were between the ages of 3 and 17 who presented to the emergency department reporting of ear pain. Children were randomized such that 32 received placebo and 31 children received topical lignocaine prior to being offered an oral pain medication. The study showed that a topical pain medication was helpful while waiting for an oral pain medication to be effective. There is another small study conducted in England and Wales that reported that an analgestic-anesthetics could reduce the amount of antibiotics being used in children. While the study did show evidence of less antibiotic use, it did not meet the sample size goal of 96 participants. Additionally did not evaluate if pain relief was linked to reduced antibiotic use.
