= Ciprofloxacin =

Fluoroquinolone antibiotic

- structure

- 3D model of ciprofloxacin

Clinical data
- Trade names: Cipro, others
- AHFS/Drugs.com: Monograph
- MedlinePlus: a688016
- License data: US DailyMed: Ciprofloxacin
- Pregnancy category: AU: B3
- Routes of administration: By mouth, intravenous, topical (ear drops, eye drops)
- Drug class: Fluoroquinolone
- ATC code: J01MA02 (WHO) S01AE03 (WHO) S02AA15 (WHO) S03AA07 (WHO) J01RA10 (WHO) J01RA11 (WHO) J01RA12 (WHO)

Legal status
- Legal status: AU: S4 (Prescription only); CA: ℞-only; UK: POM (Prescription only); US: ℞-only

Pharmacokinetic data
- Bioavailability: 70%
- Protein binding: 30%
- Metabolism: Liver
- Elimination half-life: 3.5 hours
- Excretion: Kidney

Identifiers
- IUPAC name: 1-cyclopropyl-6-fluoro-4-oxo-7-(piperazin-1-yl)-quinoline-3-carboxylic acid
- CAS Number: 85721-33-1
- PubChem CID: 2764
- DrugBank: DB00537
- ChemSpider: 2662
- UNII: 5E8K9I0O4U
- KEGG: D00186; as HCl: D02216
- ChEBI: CHEBI:100241
- ChEMBL: ChEMBL8
- NIAID ChemDB: 001992
- CompTox Dashboard (EPA): DTXSID8022824
- ECHA InfoCard: 100.123.026

Chemical and physical data
- Formula: C_{17}H_{18}FN_{3}O_{3}
- Molar mass: 331.347 g·mol^{−1}
- 3D model (JSmol): Interactive image
- SMILES: C1CNCCN1c(c2)c(F)cc3c2N(C4CC4)C=C(C3=O)C(=O)O
- InChI: InChI=1S/C17H18FN3O3/c18-13-7-11-14(8-15(13)20-5-3-19-4-6-20)21(10-1-2-10)9-12(16(11)22)17(23)24/h7-10,19H,1-6H2,(H,23,24); Key:MYSWGUAQZAJSOK-UHFFFAOYSA-N

Ciprofloxacin, sold under the brand name Cipro among others, is a fluoroquinolone antibiotic used to treat a number of bacterial infections. This includes bone and joint infections, intra-abdominal infections, certain types of infectious diarrhea, respiratory tract infections, skin infections, typhoid fever, and urinary tract infections, among others. For some infections it is used in addition to other antibiotics. It can be taken by mouth, as eye drops, as ear drops, or intravenously.

Common side effects include nausea, vomiting, and diarrhea. Severe side effects include tendon rupture, hallucinations, and nerve damage. In people with myasthenia gravis, there is worsening muscle weakness. Rates of side effects appear to be higher than some groups of antibiotics such as cephalosporins but lower than others such as clindamycin. Studies in other animals raise concerns regarding use in pregnancy. No problems were identified, however, in the children of a small number of women who took the medication. It appears to be safe during breastfeeding. It is a second-generation fluoroquinolone with a broad spectrum of activity that usually results in the death of the bacteria.

Ciprofloxacin was patented in 1980 and introduced by Bayer in 1987. It is on the World Health Organization's List of Essential Medicines. The World Health Organization classifies ciprofloxacin as critically important for human medicine. It is available as a generic medication. In 2023, it was the 155th most commonly prescribed medication in the United States, with more than 3 million prescriptions.

== Medical uses ==
Ciprofloxacin is used to treat a wide variety of infections, including infections of bones and joints, endocarditis, bacterial gastroenteritis, malignant otitis externa, bubonic plague, respiratory tract infections, cellulitis, urinary tract infections, prostatitis, anthrax, and chancroid.

Ciprofloxacin occupies an important role in treatment guidelines issued by major medical societies for the treatment of serious infections, especially those likely to be caused by Gram-negative bacteria, including Pseudomonas aeruginosa. For example, ciprofloxacin in combination with metronidazole is one of several first-line antibiotic regimens recommended by the Infectious Diseases Society of America for the treatment of community-acquired abdominal infections in adults. It also features prominently in treatment guidelines for acute pyelonephritis, complicated or hospital-acquired urinary tract infection, acute or chronic prostatitis, certain types of endocarditis, certain skin infections, and prosthetic joint infections.

In other cases, treatment guidelines are more restrictive, recommending in most cases that older, narrower-spectrum drugs be used as first-line therapy for less severe infections to minimize fluoroquinolone-resistance development. For example, the Infectious Diseases Society of America recommends the use of ciprofloxacin and other fluoroquinolones in urinary tract infections be reserved to cases of proven or expected resistance to narrower-spectrum drugs such as nitrofurantoin or trimethoprim/sulfamethoxazole. The European Association of Urology recommends ciprofloxacin as an alternative regimen for the treatment of uncomplicated urinary tract infections, but cautions that the potential for "adverse events have to be considered".

Although approved by regulatory authorities for the treatment of respiratory infections, ciprofloxacin is not recommended for respiratory infections by most treatment guidelines due in part to its modest activity against the common respiratory pathogen Streptococcus pneumoniae. "Respiratory quinolones" such as levofloxacin, having greater activity against this pathogen, are recommended as first line agents for the treatment of community-acquired pneumonia in patients with important co-morbidities and in patients requiring hospitalization (Infectious Diseases Society of America 2007). Similarly, ciprofloxacin is not recommended as a first-line treatment for acute sinusitis.

Ciprofloxacin is approved for the treatment of gonorrhea in many countries, but this recommendation is widely regarded as obsolete due to resistance development.

=== Pregnancy ===
An expert review of published data on experiences with ciprofloxacin use during pregnancy concluded therapeutic doses during pregnancy are unlikely to pose a substantial teratogenic risk (quantity and quality of data=fair), but the data is insufficient to state that no risks exist. Exposure to quinolones, including levofloxacin, during the first-trimester is not associated with an increased risk of stillbirths, premature births, birth defects, or low birth weight.

Two small post-marketing epidemiology studies of mostly short-term, first-trimester exposure found that fluoroquinolones did not increase risk of major malformations, spontaneous abortions, premature birth, or low birth weight.

=== Breastfeeding ===
Fluoroquinolones have been reported as present in a mother's milk and thus passed on to the nursing child.

=== Children ===
Oral and intravenous ciprofloxacin are approved by the FDA for use in children for only two indications due to the risk of permanent injury to the musculoskeletal system:

1. Inhalational anthrax (postexposure)
2. Complicated urinary tract infections and pyelonephritis due to Escherichia coli, but never as first-line agents.

=== Spectrum of activity ===
Its spectrum of activity includes most strains of bacterial pathogens responsible for community-acquired pneumonias, bronchitis, urinary tract infections, and gastroenteritis. Ciprofloxacin is particularly effective against Gram-negative bacteria (such as Escherichia coli, Haemophilus influenzae, Klebsiella pneumoniae, Legionella pneumophila, Moraxella catarrhalis, Proteus mirabilis, and Pseudomonas aeruginosa), but is less effective against Gram-positive bacteria (such as methicillin-sensitive Staphylococcus aureus, Streptococcus pneumoniae, and Enterococcus faecalis) than newer fluoroquinolones.

=== Bacterial resistance ===
As a result of its widespread use to treat minor infections readily treatable with older, narrower-spectrum antibiotics, many bacteria have developed resistance to this drug, leaving it significantly less effective than it would have been otherwise.

Resistance to ciprofloxacin and other fluoroquinolones may evolve rapidly, even during a course of treatment. Numerous pathogens, including enterococci, Streptococcus pyogenes, and Klebsiella pneumoniae (quinolone-resistant) now exhibit resistance. Widespread veterinary usage of fluoroquinolones, particularly in Europe, has been implicated. Meanwhile, some Burkholderia cepacia, Clostridium innocuum, and Enterococcus faecium strains have developed resistance to ciprofloxacin to varying degrees.

Fluoroquinolones had become the class of antibiotics most commonly prescribed to adults in 2002. Nearly half (42%) of those prescriptions in the US were for conditions not approved by the FDA, such as acute bronchitis, otitis media, and acute upper respiratory tract infection.

== Contraindications ==
Contraindications include:

- Taking tizanidine at the same time
- Use by those who are hypersensitive to any member of the quinolone class of antimicrobial agents
- Use by those who are diagnosed with myasthenia gravis, as muscle weakness may be exacerbated

Ciprofloxacin is also considered to be contraindicated in children (except for the indications outlined above), in pregnancy, to nursing mothers, and in people with epilepsy or other seizure disorders.

Caution may be required in people with Marfan syndrome or Ehlers–Danlos syndrome.

== Adverse effects ==
Adverse effects can involve the tendons, muscles, joints, nerves, and the central nervous system.

Rates of adverse effects appear to be higher than with some groups of antibiotics such as cephalosporins but lower than with others such as clindamycin. Compared to other antibiotics some studies find a higher rate of adverse effects while others find no difference.

In clinical trials most of the adverse events were described as mild or moderate in severity, abated soon after the drug was discontinued, and required no treatment. Some adverse effects may be permanent. Ciprofloxacin was stopped because of an adverse event in 1% of people treated with the medication by mouth. The most frequently reported drug-related events, from trials of all formulations, all dosages, all drug-therapy durations, and for all indications, were nausea (2.5%), diarrhea (1.6%), abnormal liver function tests (1.3%), vomiting (1%), and rash (1%). Other adverse events occurred at rates of <1%.

=== Tendon problems ===
Ciprofloxacin includes a boxed warning in the United States due to an increased risk of tendinitis and tendon rupture, especially in people who are older than 60 years, people who also use corticosteroids, and people with kidney, lung, or heart transplants. Tendon rupture can occur during therapy or even months after discontinuation of the medication. One study found that fluoroquinolone use was associated with a 1.9-fold increase in tendon problems. The risk increased to 3.2 in those over 60 years of age and to 6.2 in those over the age of 60 who were also taking corticosteroids. Among the 46,766 quinolone users in the study, 38 (0.08%) cases of Achilles tendon rupture were identified.

=== Cardiac arrhythmia ===
The fluoroquinolones, including ciprofloxacin, are associated with an increased risk of cardiac toxicity, including QT interval prolongation, torsades de pointes, ventricular arrhythmia, and sudden death.

=== Nervous system ===
Because Ciprofloxacin is lipophilic, it has the ability to cross the blood–brain barrier. The 2013 FDA label warns of nervous system effects. Ciprofloxacin, like other fluoroquinolones, is known to trigger seizures or lower the seizure threshold, and may cause other central nervous system adverse effects. Headache, dizziness, and insomnia have been reported as occurring fairly commonly in postapproval review articles, along with a much lower incidence of serious CNS adverse effects such as tremors, psychosis, anxiety, hallucinations, paranoia, and suicide attempts, especially at higher doses. Like other fluoroquinolones, it is also known to cause peripheral neuropathy that may be irreversible, such as weakness, burning pain, tingling or numbness.

Fluoroquinolones have already been reported for movement disorders. In this context, ciprofloxacin is especially associated with myoclonus, which derives the term "ciproclonus."

=== Cancer ===
Ciprofloxacin is active in six of eight in vitro assays used as rapid screens for the detection of genotoxic effects, but is not active in in vivo assays of genotoxicity. Long-term carcinogenicity studies in rats and mice resulted in no carcinogenic or tumorigenic effects due to ciprofloxacin at daily oral dose levels up to 250 and 750 mg/kg to rats and mice, respectively (about 1.7 and 2.5 times the highest recommended therapeutic dose based upon mg/m^{2}). Results from photo co-carcinogenicity testing indicate ciprofloxacin does not reduce the time to appearance of UV-induced skin tumors as compared to vehicle control.

=== Other ===
The other black box warning is that ciprofloxacin should not be used in people with myasthenia gravis due to possible exacerbation of muscle weakness which may lead to breathing problems resulting in death or ventilator support. Fluoroquinolones are known to block neuromuscular transmission. There are concerns that fluoroquinolones including ciprofloxacin can affect cartilage in young children.

Clostridioides difficile-associated diarrhea is a serious adverse effect of ciprofloxacin and other fluoroquinolones; it is unclear whether the risk is higher than with other broad-spectrum antibiotics.

A wide range of rare but potentially fatal adverse effects reported to the US FDA or the subject of case reports includes aortic dissection, toxic epidermal necrolysis, Stevens–Johnson syndrome, low blood pressure, allergic pneumonitis, bone marrow suppression, hepatitis or liver failure, and sensitivity to light. The medication should be discontinued if a rash, jaundice, or other sign of hypersensitivity occurs.

Children and the elderly are at a much greater risk of experiencing adverse reactions.

== Overdose ==
Overdose of ciprofloxacin may result in reversible renal toxicity. Treatment of overdose includes emptying of the stomach by induced vomiting or gastric lavage, as well as administration of antacids containing magnesium, aluminium, or calcium to reduce drug absorption. Renal function and urinary pH should be monitored. Important support includes adequate hydration and urine acidification if necessary to prevent crystalluria. Hemodialysis or peritoneal dialysis can only remove less than 10% of ciprofloxacin. Ciprofloxacin may be quantified in plasma or serum to monitor for drug accumulation in patients with hepatic dysfunction or to confirm a diagnosis of poisoning in acute overdose victims.

== Interactions ==
Ciprofloxacin interacts with certain foods and several other drugs leading to undesirable increases or decreases in the serum levels or distribution of one or both drugs.

Ciprofloxacin should not be taken with antacids containing magnesium or aluminum, highly buffered drugs (sevelamer, lanthanum carbonate, sucralfate, didanosine), or with supplements containing calcium, iron, or zinc. It should be taken two hours before or six hours after these products. Magnesium or aluminum antacids turn ciprofloxacin into insoluble salts that are not readily absorbed by the intestinal tract, reducing peak serum concentrations by 90% or more, leading to therapeutic failure. Additionally, it should not be taken with dairy products or calcium-fortified juices alone, as peak serum concentration and the area under the serum concentration-time curve can be reduced up to 40%. However, ciprofloxacin may be taken with dairy products or calcium-fortified juices as part of a meal.

Ciprofloxacin inhibits the drug-metabolizing enzyme CYP1A2 and thereby can reduce the clearance of drugs metabolized by that enzyme. CYP1A2 substrates that exhibit increased serum levels in ciprofloxacin-treated patients include tizanidine, theophylline, caffeine, methylxanthines, clozapine, olanzapine, and ropinirole. Co-administration of ciprofloxacin with the CYP1A2 substrate tizanidine (Zanaflex) is contraindicated due to a 583% increase in the peak serum concentrations of tizanidine when administered with ciprofloxacin as compared to administration of tizanidine alone. Use of ciprofloxacin is cautioned in patients on theophylline due to its narrow therapeutic index. The authors of one review recommended that patients being treated with ciprofloxacin reduce their caffeine intake. Evidence for significant interactions with several other CYP1A2 substrates such as cyclosporine is equivocal or conflicting.

The Committee on Safety of Medicines and the FDA warn that central nervous system adverse effects, including seizure risk, may be increased when NSAIDs are combined with quinolones. The mechanism for this interaction may involve a synergistic increased antagonism of GABA neurotransmission.

Altered serum levels of the antiepileptic drugs phenytoin and carbamazepine (increased and decreased) have been reported in patients receiving concomitant ciprofloxacin.

Ciprofloxacin is a potent inhibitor of CYP1A2, CYP2D6, and CYP3A4.

== Mechanism of action ==
Ciprofloxacin is a broad-spectrum antibiotic of the fluoroquinolone class. It is active against some Gram-positive and many Gram-negative bacteria. It functions by inhibiting a type II topoisomerase (DNA gyrase) and topoisomerase IV, necessary to separate bacterial DNA, thereby inhibiting cell division. Bacterial DNA fragmentation will occur as a result of inhibition of the enzymes.

== Pharmacokinetics ==
Ciprofloxacin for systemic administration is available as immediate-release tablets, extended-release tablets, an oral suspension, and as a solution for intravenous administration. When administered over one hour as an intravenous infusion, ciprofloxacin rapidly distributes into the tissues, with levels in some tissues exceeding those in the serum. Penetration into the central nervous system is relatively modest, with cerebrospinal fluid levels normally less than 10% of peak serum concentrations. The serum half-life of ciprofloxacin is about 4–6 hours, with 50–70% of an administered dose being excreted in the urine as unmetabolized drug. An additional 10% is excreted in urine as metabolites. Urinary excretion is virtually complete 24 hours after administration. Dose adjustment is required in the elderly and in those with renal impairment.

Ciprofloxacin is weakly bound to serum proteins (20–40%). It is an inhibitor of the drug-metabolizing enzyme cytochrome P450 1A2, which leads to the potential for clinically important drug interactions with drugs metabolized by that enzyme. Ciprofloxacin is about 70% available when administered orally.

The extended release tablets allow once-daily administration by releasing the drug more slowly in the gastrointestinal tract. These tablets contain 35% of the administered dose in an immediate-release form and 65% in a slow-release matrix. Maximum serum concentrations are achieved between 1 and 4 hours after administration. Compared to the 250- and 500-mg immediate-release tablets, the 500-mg and 1000-mg XR tablets provide higher C_{max}, but the 24‑hour AUCs are equivalent.

Ciprofloxacin immediate-release tablets contain ciprofloxacin as the hydrochloride salt, and the XR tablets contain a mixture of the hydrochloride salt and the free base.

== Chemical properties ==
Ciprofloxacin is 1-cyclopropyl-6-fluoro-1,4-dihydro-4-oxo-7-(1-piperazinyl)-3-quinolinecarboxylic acid. Its empirical formula is C_{17}H_{18}FN_{3}O_{3} and its molecular weight is 331.4 g/mol. It is a faintly yellowish to light yellow crystalline substance.

Ciprofloxacin hydrochloride is the monohydrochloride monohydrate salt of ciprofloxacin. It is a faintly yellowish to light yellow crystalline substance with a molecular weight of 385.8 g/mol. Its empirical formula is C_{17}H_{18}FN_{3}O_{3}HCl•H_{2}O.

== Usage ==
Ciprofloxacin is the most widely used of the second-generation quinolones. In 2010, over 20 million prescriptions were written, making it the 35th-most-commonly prescribed generic drug and the 5th-most-commonly prescribed antibacterial in the US.

== History ==
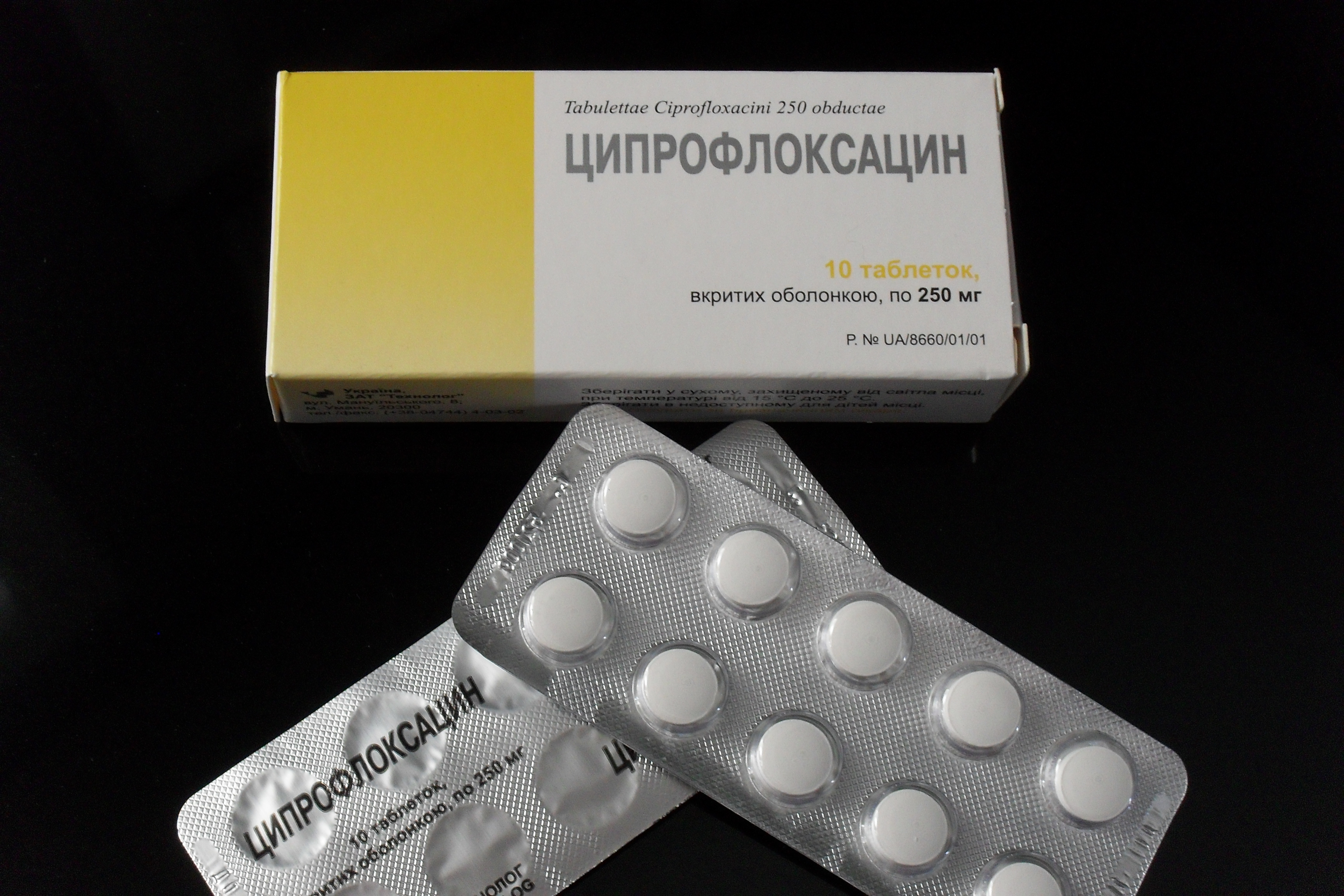
Ciprofloxacin 250-mg tablets from Ukraine

The first members of the quinolone antibacterial class were relatively low-potency drugs such as nalidixic acid, used mainly in the treatment of urinary tract infections owing to their renal excretion and propensity to be concentrated in urine. In 1979, the publication of a patent filed by the pharmaceutical arm of Kyorin Seiyaku Kabushiki Kaisha disclosed the discovery of norfloxacin, and the demonstration that certain structural modifications including the attachment of a fluorine atom to the quinolone ring leads to dramatically enhanced antibacterial potency. In the aftermath of this disclosure, several other pharmaceutical companies initiated research and development programs with the goal of discovering additional antibacterial agents of the fluoroquinolone class.

The fluoroquinolone program at Bayer focused on examining the effects of very minor changes to the norfloxacin structure. In 1983, the company published in vitro potency data for ciprofloxacin, a fluoroquinolone antibacterial having a chemical structure differing from that of norfloxacin by the presence of a single carbon atom. This small change led to a two- to 10-fold increase in potency against most strains of Gram-negative bacteria. Importantly, this structural change led to a four-fold improvement in activity against the important Gram-negative pathogen Pseudomonas aeruginosa, making ciprofloxacin one of the most potent known drugs for the treatment of this intrinsically antibiotic-resistant pathogen.

The oral tablet form of ciprofloxacin was approved in October 1987, just one year after the approval of norfloxacin. In 1991, the intravenous formulation was introduced. Ciprofloxacin sales reached a peak of about 2 billion euros in 2001, before Bayer's patent expired in 2004, after which annual sales have averaged around €200 million.

The name probably originates from the International Scientific Nomenclature: ci- (alteration of cycl-) + propyl + fluor- + ox- + az- + -mycin.

== Society and culture ==
=== Economics ===
Ciprofloxacin is available as a low-cost generic medication.

=== Generic equivalents ===
In October 2001, the Prescription Access Litigation (PAL) project filed suit to dissolve an agreement between Bayer and three of its competitors which produced generic versions of drugs (Barr Laboratories, Rugby Laboratories, and Hoechst-Marion-Roussel) that PAL claimed was blocking access to adequate supplies and cheaper, generic versions of ciprofloxacin. The plaintiffs charged that Bayer Corporation, a unit of Bayer AG, had unlawfully paid the three competing companies a total of $200 million to prevent cheaper, generic versions of ciprofloxacin from being brought to the market, as well as manipulating its price and supply. Numerous other consumer advocacy groups joined the lawsuit. On 15 October 2008, five years after Bayer's patent had expired, the United States District Court for the Eastern District of New York granted Bayer's and the other defendants' motion for summary judgment, holding that any anticompetitive effects caused by the settlement agreements between Bayer and its codefendants were within the exclusionary zone of the patent and thus could not be redressed by federal antitrust law, in effect upholding Bayer's agreement with its competitors.

=== Available forms ===
Ciprofloxacin for systemic administration is available as immediate-release tablets, as extended-release tablets, as an oral suspension, and as a solution for intravenous infusion. It is available for local administration as eye drops and ear drops. It is available in combination with dexamethasone, with celecoxib, with hydrocortisone, and with fluocinolone acetonide.

=== Litigation ===
A class action was filed against Bayer AG on behalf of employees of the Brentwood Post Office in Washington, D.C., and workers at the U.S. Capitol, along with employees of American Media, Inc. in Florida and postal workers in general who alleged they developed serious adverse effects from taking ciprofloxacin in the aftermath of the anthrax attacks in 2001. The action alleged Bayer failed to warn class members of the potential side effects of the drug, thereby violating the Pennsylvania Unfair Trade Practices and Consumer Protection Laws. The class action was defeated and the litigation abandoned by the plaintiffs. A similar action was filed in 2003 in New Jersey by four New Jersey postal workers but was withdrawn for lack of grounds, as workers had been informed of the risks of ciprofloxacin when they were given the option of taking the drug.

== Research ==
As resistance to ciprofloxacin has grown since its introduction, research has been conducted to discover and develop analogs that can be effective against resistant bacteria; some have been looked at in antiviral models as well.
