= Urinary kallikrein =

Urinary kallikrein may refer to:

- Plasma kallikrein, an enzyme
- Renal tissue kallikrein, an enzyme
