= Cianergoline =

Clinical data
- Other names: 355/1057; 6-Methyl-8β-(2-cyano)propionamidoergoline; 2-Cyano-3-(6-methylergolin-8β-yl)propionamide; 2-CMEBP
- Drug class: Dopamine receptor agonist; Antihypertensive agent
- ATC code: None

Identifiers
- IUPAC name: 3-[(6aR,9S,10aR)-7-methyl-6,6a,8,9,10,10a-hexahydro-4H-indolo[4,3-fg]quinolin-9-yl]-2-cyanopropanamide
- CAS Number: 74627-35-3
- PubChem CID: 71136
- ChemSpider: 64282
- UNII: 6337Z9RO7D
- ChEMBL: ChEMBL2106009
- CompTox Dashboard (EPA): DTXSID00996136

Chemical and physical data
- Formula: C_{19}H_{22}N_{4}O
- Molar mass: 322.412 g·mol^{−1}
- 3D model (JSmol): Interactive image
- SMILES: CN1C[C@@H](C[C@H]2[C@H]1CC3=CNC4=CC=CC2=C34)CC(C#N)C(=O)N
- InChI: InChI=1S/C19H22N4O/c1-23-10-11(5-12(8-20)19(21)24)6-15-14-3-2-4-16-18(14)13(9-22-16)7-17(15)23/h2-4,9,11-12,15,17,22H,5-7,10H2,1H3,(H2,21,24)/t11-,12?,15-,17-/m1/s1; Key:LVMVXZOPCAMYHC-QOAXCGLXSA-N

Cianergoline (INN), also known as 355/1057 or as 2-cyano-3-(6-methylergolin-8β-yl)propionamide (2-CMEBP), is a dopamine receptor agonist described as an antihypertensive agent of the ergoline family which was never marketed. It has atypical properties as a dopamine receptor agonist compared to other ergolines, for instance having less central activity and showing predominant cardiovascular effects. In addition to its dopamine receptor agonism, cianergoline may interact with α-adrenergic receptors, which may or may not also be involved in its antihypertensive effects. The drug was first described in the scientific literature by 1983. It was studied for treatment of essential hypertension.

== See also ==
- Substituted ergoline
- VUFB-6683
