= Ciprofloxacin/hydrocortisone =

Combination medication

Combination of
- Ciprofloxacin: Antibacterial
- Hydrocortisone: Anti-inflammatory

Clinical data
- Trade names: Cipro Hc
- AHFS/Drugs.com: Multum Consumer Information
- MedlinePlus: a607009
- License data: US DailyMed: Ciprofloxacin and hydrocortisone
- Routes of administration: Auricular (otic)
- ATC code: S02CA03 (WHO)

Legal status
- Legal status: US: ℞-only

Identifiers
- KEGG: D11582

Ciprofloxacin/hydrocortisone, sold under the brand name Cipro Hc among others is a fixed-dose combination medication used for the treatment of otitis externa. It contains ciprofloxacin, as the salt ciprofloxacin hydrochloride, an antibacterial; and hydrocortisone, an anti-inflammatory corticosteroid.

Ciprofloxacin/hydrocortisone was approved for medical use in the United States in February 1998.

== Medical uses ==
Ciprofloxacin/hydrocortisone is indicated for the treatment of acute otitis externa due to susceptible strains of Pseudomonas aeruginosa, Staphylococcus aureus, and Proteus mirabilis.
