= Cinepazet =

Chemical compound

Clinical data
- ATC code: C01DX14 (WHO)

Identifiers
- IUPAC name: Ethyl 2-{4-[(2Z)-3-(3,4,5-trimethoxyphenyl)prop-2-enoyl]piperazin-1-yl}acetate
- CAS Number: 23887-41-4
- PubChem CID: 6434395
- ChemSpider: 4939323
- UNII: 0LC95WWE9Q
- ChEMBL: ChEMBL2110784
- CompTox Dashboard (EPA): DTXSID901119699 DTXSID20878521, DTXSID901119699
- ECHA InfoCard: 100.041.738

Chemical and physical data
- Formula: C_{20}H_{28}N_{2}O_{6}
- Molar mass: 392.452 g·mol^{−1}
- 3D model (JSmol): Interactive image
- Density: 1.172 g/cm^{3}
- SMILES: CCOC(=O)CN1CCN(CC1)C(=O)\C=C\c2cc(OC)c(OC)c(OC)c2
- InChI: InChI=1S/C20H28N2O6/c1-5-28-19(24)14-21-8-10-22(11-9-21)18(23)7-6-15-12-16(25-2)20(27-4)17(13-15)26-3/h6-7,12-13H,5,8-11,14H2,1-4H3/b7-6+; Key:XDUOTWNXVDBCDY-VOTSOKGWSA-N

Cinepazet is a vasodilator and is an ethyl ester derivative of cinepazic acid.
