= PDE1B =

Protein-coding gene in the species Homo sapiens

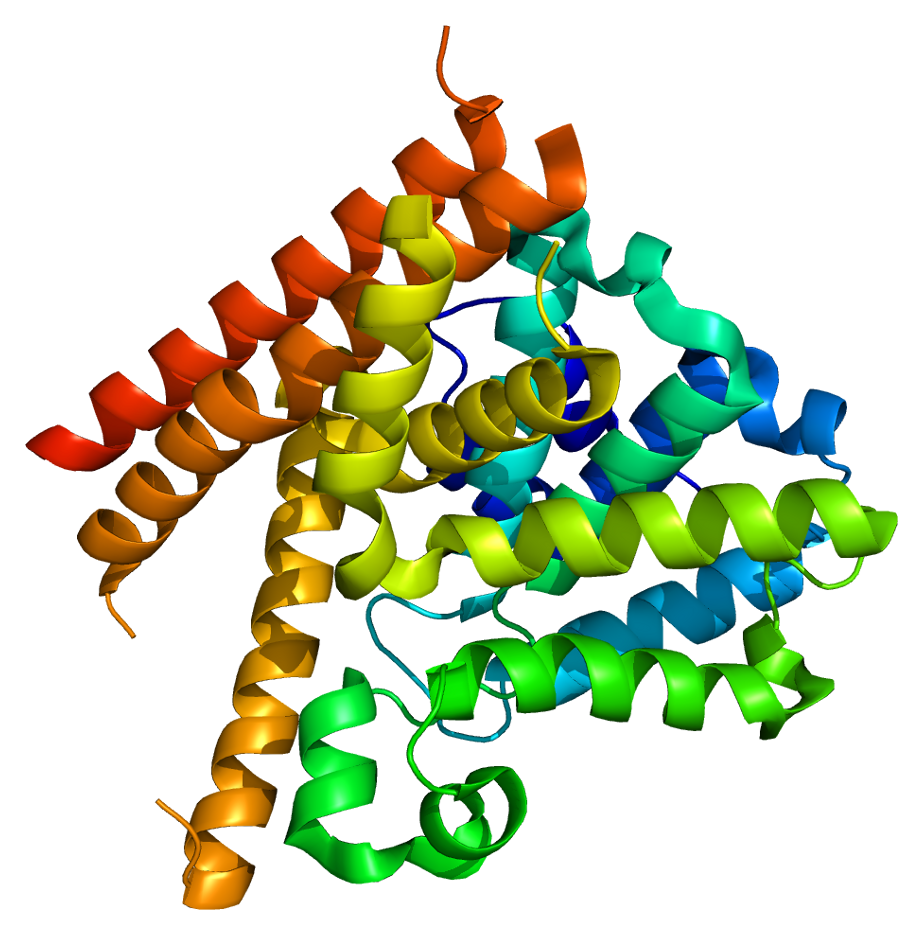

Identifiers
- Aliases: PDE1B, PDE1B1, PDES1B, HEL-S-79p, phosphodiesterase 1B
- External IDs: OMIM: 171891; MGI: 97523; GeneCards: PDE1B
Available structures
PDB	Ortholog search: PDBe RCSB
PDB	List of PDB id codes 1TAZ, 4NPV, 4NPW, 5B25
Enzyme activity
EC #	BRENDA	ExPASy	KEGG	MetaCyc
3.1.4.17	↗	↗	↗	↗

Gene location (Human)
Chr.	Chromosome 12 (human)
Band	12q13.2	Start	54,549,601 bp
Band	12q13.2	End	54,579,239 bp

Gene location (Mouse)
Chr.	Chromosome 15 (mouse)
Band	15|15 F3	Start	103,411,461 bp
Band	15|15 F3	End	103,438,479 bp
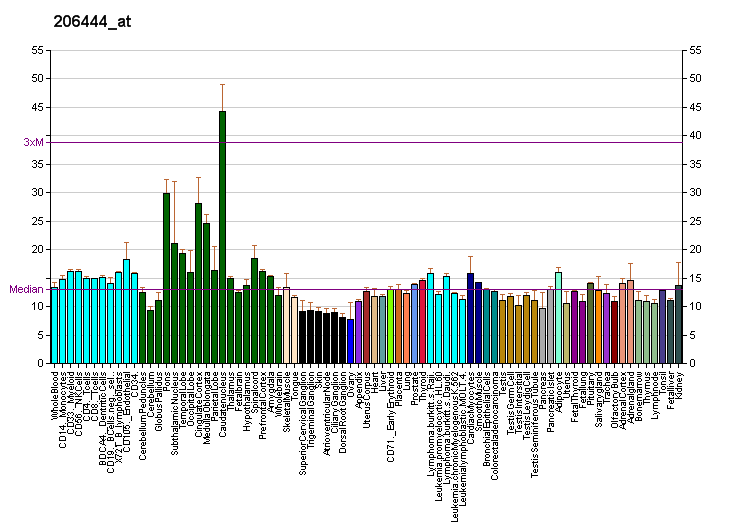
RNA expression pattern
Bgee	Human / Mouse (ortholog); Top expressed in: caudate nucleus; nucleus accumbens; putamen; gastric mucosa; right frontal lobe; prefrontal cortex; Descending thoracic aorta; Brodmann area 9; cingulate gyrus; anterior cingulate cortex / Top expressed in: olfactory tubercle; nucleus accumbens; superior frontal gyrus; globus pallidus; ventricular zone; perirhinal cortex; granulocyte; entorhinal cortex; dentate gyrus of hippocampal formation granule cell; superior colliculus; More reference expression data
BioGPS	More reference expression data
Gene ontology
Molecular function	3',5'-cyclic-nucleotide phosphodiesterase activity; metal ion binding; calmodulin binding; cyclic-nucleotide phosphodiesterase activity; calmodulin-dependent cyclic-nucleotide phosphodiesterase activity; protein binding; phosphoric diester hydrolase activity; hydrolase activity; calcium- and calmodulin-regulated 3',5'-cyclic-GMP phosphodiesterase activity; 3',5'-cyclic-AMP phosphodiesterase activity; 3',5'-cyclic-GMP phosphodiesterase activity
Cellular component	cytoplasm; soma; cytosol
Biological process	visual learning; regulation of neurotransmitter levels; cAMP catabolic process; locomotory behavior; response to amphetamine; serotonin metabolic process; monocyte differentiation; regulation of dopamine metabolic process; cellular response to macrophage colony-stimulating factor stimulus; cGMP catabolic process; cellular response to granulocyte macrophage colony-stimulating factor stimulus; apoptotic process; signal transduction; G protein-coupled receptor signaling pathway
Sources:Amigo / QuickGO
Orthologs
Databases	NCBI: entry; OMA: entry
Species	Human	Mouse
Entrez	5153	18574
Ensembl	ENSG00000123360	ENSMUSG00000022489
UniProt	Q01064	Q01065
RefSeq (mRNA)	NM_000924; NM_001165975; NM_001288768; NM_001288769; NM_001315534 NM_001315535	NM_001285890; NM_008800; NM_001357980
RefSeq (protein)	NP_000915; NP_001159447; NP_001275697; NP_001275698; NP_001302463 NP_001302464	NP_001272819; NP_032826; NP_001344909
Location (UCSC)	Chr 12: 54.55 – 54.58 Mb	Chr 15: 103.41 – 103.44 Mb
PubMed search
- Wikidata
View/Edit Human	View/Edit Mouse

Calcium/calmodulin-dependent 3',5'-cyclic nucleotide phosphodiesterase 1B is an enzyme that in humans is encoded by the PDE1B gene.
