= Cixutumumab =

Monoclonal antibody

Monoclonal antibody
- Type: Whole antibody
- Source: Human
- Target: IGF-1 receptor

Clinical data
- Routes of administration: IV
- ATC code: none

Identifiers
- CAS Number: 947687-12-9
- ChemSpider: none
- UNII: 2285XW22DR
- KEGG: D09328

Chemical and physical data
- Formula: C_{6500}H_{10052}N_{1724}O_{2036}S_{44}
- Molar mass: 146336.59 g·mol^{−1}

Cixutumumab (IMC-A12) is a human monoclonal antibody for the treatment of solid tumors.

This drug was developed by ImClone Systems, since acquired by Eli Lilly, using phage display technology from Dyax.

It is a fully human IgG1 monoclonal antibody directed against the human insulin-like growth factor-1 receptor (IGF-1R) with potential antineoplastic activity. Cixutumumab selectively binds to membrane-bound IGF-1R, thereby preventing the binding of the ligand IGF-1 and subsequent activation of PI3K/AKT signaling pathway. Downregulation of the PI3K/AKT survival pathway may result in the induction of cancer cell apoptosis and may decrease cancer cellular proliferation. IGF-1R, a receptor tyrosine kinase of the insulin receptor superfamily overexpressed by many cancer cell types, stimulates cell proliferation, enables oncogenic transformation, and suppresses apoptosis; IGF-1R signaling has been implicated in tumorigenesis and metastasis.

== Research ==
Phase II clinical trials have been completed in patients with non-small cell lung cancer, metastatic rhabdomyosarcoma, metastatic prostate cancer, metastatic pancreatic cancer, metastatic esophageal cancer, bone cancer, sarcoma, solid tumors, ocular melanoma, hepatocellular carcinoma, breast cancer and other forms of cancer. Despite these extensive trials, more than 45 phase I and II clinical trials in total, phase III trials have never been undertaken and Eli Lilly has removed cixutumumab from their development pipeline.
