= Citatuzumab bogatox =

Pharmaceutical drug

Monoclonal antibody
- Type: Fab fragment
- Source: Humanized (from mouse)
- Target: TACSTD1

Clinical data
- ATC code: none

Identifiers
- CAS Number: 945228-49-9
- ChemSpider: none
- UNII: 23J303Z5CA

Chemical and physical data
- Formula: C_{3455}H_{5371}N_{921}O_{1060}S_{18}
- Molar mass: 77348.44 g·mol^{−1}

Citatuzumab bogatox (VB6-845) is a monoclonal antibody Fab fragment fused with bouganin, a ribosome inactivating protein from the plant Bougainvillea spectabilis. It has undergone preclinical development for the treatment of ovarian cancer and other solid tumors.
