= VUFB-6683 =

Clinical data
- Other names: VUFB6683; Deprenon; Deprenone; 6-Methylergoline-8β-acetamide; D-8β-(Carbamoylmethyl)-6-methylergoline
- Routes of administration: Oral
- Drug class: Dopamine receptor agonist; Prolactin inhibitor
- ATC code: None

Identifiers
- IUPAC name: 2-[(6aR,9S,10aR)-7-methyl-6,6a,8,9,10,10a-hexahydro-4H-indolo[4,3-fg]quinolin-9-yl]acetamide
- CAS Number: 33529-63-4 41562-69-0 (ditartrate)
- PubChem CID: 21124022; ditartrate: 91799746
- ChemSpider: 19989264
- UNII: D7HH5OGW9W

Chemical and physical data
- Formula: C_{17}H_{21}N_{3}O
- Molar mass: 283.375 g·mol^{−1}
- 3D model (JSmol): Interactive image
- SMILES: CN1C[C@@H](C[C@H]2[C@H]1CC3=CNC4=CC=CC2=C34)CC(=O)N
- InChI: InChI=1S/C17H21N3O/c1-20-9-10(6-16(18)21)5-13-12-3-2-4-14-17(12)11(8-19-14)7-15(13)20/h2-4,8,10,13,15,19H,5-7,9H2,1H3,(H2,18,21)/t10-,13+,15+/m0/s1; Key:CHCGOOUKGROCOZ-PSOPSSQASA-N

VUFB-6683, also known as Deprenon or as 6-methylergoline-8β-acetamide, is a dopamine agonist and prolactin inhibitor of the ergoline family. It has been clinically studied for the treatment of infertility due to hyperprolactinemia and for lactation suppression in women under the name Deprenon. The drug was first described in the scientific literature by 1973.

== See also ==
- Substituted ergoline
- Cianergoline
