= Trans-3-(4-Methoxyphenyl)-N-(pentan-3-yl)acrylamide =

trans-3-(4-Methoxyphenyl)-N-(pentan-3-yl)acrylamide

Names
- Other names TMPPAA

Identifiers
CAS Number	844900-50-1
3D model (JSmol)	Interactive image
ChEMBL	ChEMBL3718075
ChemSpider	777905
EC Number	110-715-0
PubChem CID	889955
- InChI: InChI=1S/C15H21NO2/c1-4-13(5-2)16-15(17)11-8-12-6-9-14(18-3)10-7-12/h6-11,13H,4-5H2,1-3H3,(H,16,17)/b11-8+ Key: SPXCFGAFVLQEJK-DHZHZOJOSA-N
- SMILES: CCC(CC)NC(=O)/C=C/C1=CC=C(C=C1)OC

Properties
Chemical formula	C_{15}H_{21}NO_{2}
Molar mass	247.338 g·mol^{−1}

Hazards
- GHS labelling
Pictograms	(GHS07: Exclamation mark)
Signal word	Warning
Hazard statements	H302
Precautionary statements	P264, P270, P301+P317, P330, P501
- Except where otherwise noted, data are given for materials in their standard state (at 25 °C [77 °F], 100 kPa). Infobox references

trans-3-(4-Methoxyphenyl)-N-(pentan-3-yl)acrylamide, commonly referred as TMPPAA, is a allosteric agonist and positive allosteric modulator (PAM) of 5-HT_{3} receptor. It has the molecular formula C_{15}H_{21}NO_{2}. TMPPAA behaves as both an agonist and a PAM at 5-HT3A receptors, not via binding at the orthosteric site.

== Pharmacology and mechanism of action ==
It is a synthetic compound that functions as an allosteric agonist and positive allosteric modulator of the 5-HT3 serotonin receptor. While traditional ligands bind to the extracellular orthosteric site, chimeric and mutational studies indicate that TMPPAA interacts directly with the receptor's transmembrane domain. Electrophysiological experiments show that the compound exhibits distinct desensitization kinetics and causes a progressive current run-down, demonstrating a mechanism of activation separate from serotonin.
