= Ciluprevir =

Chemical compound

Clinical data
- Routes of administration: By mouth
- ATC code: None

Legal status
- Legal status: Development terminated

Pharmacokinetic data
- Protein binding: >99.1%

Identifiers
- IUPAC name: (2R,6S,12Z,13aS,14aR,16aS)-6-[(Cyclopentyloxycarbonyl)amino]-2-({7-methoxy-2-[(propan-2-ylamino)-1,3-thiazol-4-yl]quinolin- 4-yl}oxy)-5,16-dioxo-1,2,3,6,7,8,9,10,11,13a,14,15,16,16a-tetradecahydrocyclopropa[e]pyrrolo[1,2-a][1,4]diazacyclopentadecine-14a(5H)-carboxylic acid
- CAS Number: 300832-84-2
- PubChem CID: 9853710
- ChemSpider: 8029420
- UNII: 75C8DU40T0
- ChEMBL: ChEMBL297884
- CompTox Dashboard (EPA): DTXSID50870316

Chemical and physical data
- Formula: C_{40}H_{50}N_{6}O_{8}S
- Molar mass: 774.93 g·mol^{−1}
- 3D model (JSmol)
- SMILES: O=C2N[C@]7(C(=O)O)C[C@H]7/C=C\CCCCC[C@H](NC(=O)OC1CCCC1)C(=O)N6[C@H]2C[C@@H](Oc3cc(nc4c3ccc(OC)c4)c5nc(sc5)NC(C)C)C6
- InChI: InChI=1S/C40H50N6O8S/c1-23(2)41-38-43-32(22-55-38)31-19-34(28-16-15-26(52-3)17-30(28)42-31)53-27-18-33-35(47)45-40(37(49)50)20-24(40)11-7-5-4-6-8-14-29(36(48)46(33)21-27)44-39(51)54-25-12-9-10-13-25/h7,11,15-17,19,22-25,27,29,33H,4-6,8-10,12-14,18,20-21H2,1-3H3,(H,41,43)(H,44,51)(H,45,47)(H,49,50)/b11-7-/t24-,27-,29+,33+,40-/m1/s1; Key:PJZPDFUUXKKDNB-KNINVFKUSA-N

Ciluprevir was a drug used experimentally in the treatment of hepatitis C. It is manufactured by Boehringer Ingelheim and developed under the research code of BILN 2061. It was the first-in-class NS3/4A protease inhibitor to enter clinical development and tested in human. Ciluprevir is a potent competitive reversible inhibitor of NS3/4A protease from HCV genotype 1a (K_{i} = 0.3 nM) and 1b (K_{i} = 0.66 nM). It shows good selectivity for NS3 protease against representative serine and cysteine proteases, human leukocyte elastase and cathepsin B (IC_{50} > 30 μM).

Its development was halted in phase Ib clinical trials because of toxicity in animals. However, ciluprevir scaffold was exploited to design new macrocyclic inhibitors such as simeprevir (TMC-435) and danoprevir.
