= Azapetine =

Chemical compound

Clinical data
- ATC code: C04AX30 (WHO)

Identifiers
- IUPAC name: 6-prop-2-enyl-5,7-dihydrobenzo[d][2]benzazepine
- CAS Number: 146-36-1
- PubChem CID: 8966
- ChemSpider: 8620
- UNII: 9TTR0UA2KC
- ChEMBL: ChEMBL2110596
- CompTox Dashboard (EPA): DTXSID50163250
- ECHA InfoCard: 100.005.153

Chemical and physical data
- Formula: C_{17}H_{17}N
- Molar mass: 235.330 g·mol^{−1}
- 3D model (JSmol): Interactive image
- SMILES: c3cc2c(c1c(cccc1)CN(C2)C\C=C)cc3
- InChI: InChI=1S/C17H17N/c1-2-11-18-12-14-7-3-5-9-16(14)17-10-6-4-8-15(17)13-18/h2-10H,1,11-13H2; Key:NYGHGTMKALXFIA-UHFFFAOYSA-N

Azapetine is a vasodilator.
