= Vincamine =

Chemical compound

Clinical data
- Trade names: Oxybral SR
- AHFS/Drugs.com: International Drug Names
- Routes of administration: Oral
- ATC code: C04AX07 (WHO)

Identifiers
- IUPAC name: (3α,14β,16α)-14,15-Dihydro-14-hydroxyeburnamenine-14-carboxylic acid methyl ester or Methyl (15R,17S,19R)-15-ethyl-17-hydroxy-1,11-diazapentacyclo[9.6.2.0^{2,7}.0^{8,18}.0^{15,19}]nonadeca-2(7),3,5,8(18)-tetraene-17-carboxylate
- CAS Number: 1617-90-9
- PubChem CID: 15376
- IUPHAR/BPS: 349
- DrugBank: DB13374
- ChemSpider: 14635
- UNII: 996XVD0JHT
- KEGG: D08677
- ChEMBL: ChEMBL1165342
- CompTox Dashboard (EPA): DTXSID9040134
- ECHA InfoCard: 100.015.070

Chemical and physical data
- Formula: C_{21}H_{26}N_{2}O_{3}
- Molar mass: 354.450 g·mol^{−1}
- 3D model (JSmol): Interactive image
- SMILES: O=C(OC)[C@]3(O)n1c4c(c2ccccc12)CCN5CCC[C@](C3)(CC)[C@@H]45
- InChI: InChI=1S/C21H26N2O3/c1-3-20-10-6-11-22-12-9-15-14-7-4-5-8-16(14)23(17(15)18(20)22)21(25,13-20)19(24)26-2/h4-5,7-8,18,25H,3,6,9-13H2,1-2H3/t18-,20+,21+/m1/s1; Key:RXPRRQLKFXBCSJ-GIVPXCGWSA-N

Vincamine is a monoterpenoid indole alkaloid found in the leaves of Vinca minor (lesser periwinkle), comprising about 25–65% of its indole alkaloids by weight. It can also be synthesized from related alkaloids.

== Uses ==
Vincamine is sold in Europe as a prescription medicine for the treatment of primary degenerative and vascular dementia. In the United States, it is permitted to be sold as a dietary supplement when labeled for use in adults for six months or less. Most common preparations are in the sustained release tablet forms.

== Chemistry ==
=== Synthesis ===
Tabersonine can be used for semi-synthesis of vincamine.

=== Derivatives ===
Vinpocetine is a synthetic derivative of vincamine used for cerebrovascular diseases and as dietary supplement. Vincamine derivatives have been also studied as anti addictive and antidiabetic agents.

== Research ==
It may have nootropic effects. It has been investigated as novel anticancer drug.

Concerns over long-term use have been documented by the US National Toxicology Program.

== See also ==
- Apparicine
- Conophylline
