= Cinamolol =

Chemical compound

Clinical data
- ATC code: none

Identifiers
- IUPAC name: Methyl (2E)-3-{2-[2-hydroxy-3-(isopropylamino)propoxy]phenyl}acrylate
- CAS Number: 39099-98-4
- PubChem CID: 6443797
- ChemSpider: 4947759
- UNII: 7531Q8398Y
- ChEMBL: ChEMBL1742425
- CompTox Dashboard (EPA): DTXSID101031594

Chemical and physical data
- Formula: C_{16}H_{23}NO_{4}
- Molar mass: 293.363 g·mol^{−1}
- 3D model (JSmol): Interactive image
- SMILES: CC(C)NCC(COC1=CC=CC=C1/C=C/C(=O)OC)O
- InChI: InChI=1S/C16H23NO4/c1-12(2)17-10-14(18)11-21-15-7-5-4-6-13(15)8-9-16(19)20-3/h4-9,12,14,17-18H,10-11H2,1-3H3/b9-8+; Key:LWRSDAUWAOJRPA-CMDGGOBGSA-N

Cinamolol is a beta blocker.
