= Ciclonicate =

Chemical compound

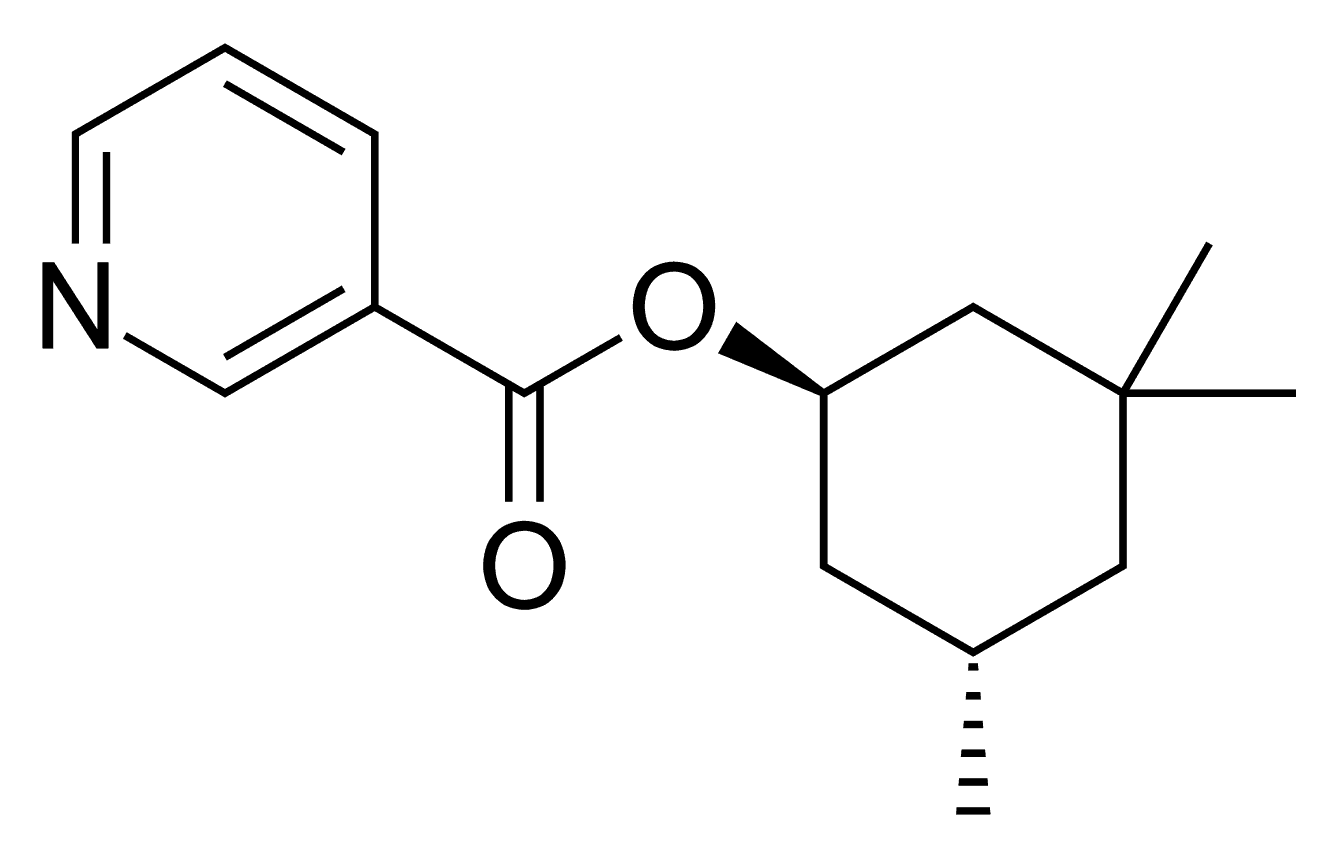

Clinical data
- ATC code: C04AC07 (WHO)

Identifiers
- IUPAC name: trans-3,3,5-Trimethylcyclohexyl pyridine-3-carboxylate
- CAS Number: 53449-58-4
- PubChem CID: 10444661
- ChemSpider: 8620080
- UNII: 7H634NXI03
- ChEMBL: ChEMBL2104521
- CompTox Dashboard (EPA): DTXSID001023827
- ECHA InfoCard: 100.053.221

Chemical and physical data
- Formula: C_{15}H_{21}NO_{2}
- Molar mass: 247.338 g·mol^{−1}
- 3D model (JSmol): Interactive image
- SMILES: O=C(O[C@@H]1C[C@@H](C)CC(C)(C)C1)c2cccnc2
- InChI: InChI=1S/C15H21NO2/c1-11-7-13(9-15(2,3)8-11)18-14(17)12-5-4-6-16-10-12/h4-6,10-11,13H,7-9H2,1-3H3/t11-,13-/m1/s1; Key:GQSGZTBDVNUIQS-DGCLKSJQSA-N

Ciclonicate is a vasodilator.
