= Cilazapril =

Antihypertensive drug of the ACE inhibitor class

- Kekulé, stereo, skeletal formula of cilazapril ((1S,9S)-9-[(2S)-2-yl]amin,-1-carbox)

Names
- Preferred IUPAC name (1S,9S)-9-{[(2S)-1-Ethoxy-1-oxo-4-phenylbutan-2-yl]amino}-10-oxooctahydro-6H-pyridazino[1,2-a][1,2]diazepine-1-carboxylic acid

Identifiers
CAS Number	88768-40-5
3D model (JSmol)	Interactive image
ChEBI	CHEBI:3698
ChEMBL	ChEMBL515606
ChemSpider	50831
DrugBank	DB01340
ECHA InfoCard	100.168.764
IUPHAR/BPS	6459
KEGG	D07699
PubChem CID	56330; 40467985 (1R,9S)-(2S)-butylamino isomer
UNII	8Q9454114Q
CompTox Dashboard (EPA)	DTXSID1048629
- InChI: InChI=1S/C22H31N3O5/c1-2-30-22(29)18(13-12-16-8-4-3-5-9-16)23-17-10-6-14-24-15-7-11-19(21(27)28)25(24)20(17)26/h3-5,8-9,17-19,23H,2,6-7,10-15H2,1H3,(H,27,28) Key: HHHKFGXWKKUNCY-UHFFFAOYSA-N
- SMILES: CCOC(=O)C(CCc1ccccc1)NC1CCCN2CCCC(N2C1=O)C(O)=O

Properties
Chemical formula	C_{22}H_{31}N_{3}O_{5}
Molar mass	417.506 g·mol^{−1}
log P	2.212
Acidity (pK_{a})	2.285
Basicity (pK_{b})	11.712

Pharmacology
ATC code	C09AA08 (WHO)
Routes of administration	Oral
Legal status	UK: POM (Prescription only)
- Except where otherwise noted, data are given for materials in their standard state (at 25 °C [77 °F], 100 kPa). verify (what is ?) Infobox references

Cilazapril is an angiotensin-converting enzyme inhibitor (ACE inhibitor) used for the treatment of hypertension and congestive heart failure.

It was patented in 1982 and approved for medical use in 1990.

== Chemistry ==
Of the eight possible stereoisomers, only the all-(S)-form is medically viable.

== Brand names ==
It is branded as Dynorm, Inhibace, Vascace and many other names in various countries. None of these are available in the United States as of May 2010.
