= Ciclafrine =

Chemical compound

Clinical data
- Other names: Go 3026A; W-43026A
- ATC code: None

Identifiers
- IUPAC name: 3-(1-Oxa-4-azaspiro[4.6]undec-2-yl)phenol
- CAS Number: 55694-98-9
- PubChem CID: 193971
- ChemSpider: 168322
- UNII: 76HZX0GVCD
- ChEMBL: ChEMBL2110798
- CompTox Dashboard (EPA): DTXSID60971060

Chemical and physical data
- Formula: C_{15}H_{21}NO_{2}
- Molar mass: 247.338 g·mol^{−1}
- 3D model (JSmol): Interactive image
- SMILES: c1cc(cc(c1)O)C2CNC3(O2)CCCCCC3
- InChI: InChI=1S/C15H21NO2/c17-13-7-5-6-12(10-13)14-11-16-15(18-14)8-3-1-2-4-9-15/h5-7,10,14,16-17H,1-4,8-9,11H2; Key:AJNAKEPPGKJNKU-UHFFFAOYSA-N

Ciclafrine (INN; developmental code names Go 3026A, W-43026A) is a sympathomimetic and antihypotensive agent of the phenethylamine family that was never marketed.

== Chemistry ==
Ciclafrine is a substituted phenethylamine and belongs to the class of hemiaminal ethers.

=== Synthesis ===
Ciclafrine can be prepared by the reaction of norfenefrine with cycloheptanone.

Ciclafrine synthesis

== See also ==
- Berefrine
