= Cinepazide =

Chemical compound

Clinical data
- ATC code: C04AX27 (WHO)

Identifiers
- IUPAC name: (2E)-1-{4-[2-Oxo-2-(1-pyrrolidinyl)ethyl]-1-piperazinyl}-3-(3,4,5-trimethoxyphenyl)-2-propen-1-one
- CAS Number: 23887-46-9
- PubChem CID: 5282459
- ChemSpider: 4445611
- UNII: 67Y4P5C84X
- ChEMBL: ChEMBL1874750
- CompTox Dashboard (EPA): DTXSID901112229 DTXSID5048261, DTXSID901112229
- ECHA InfoCard: 100.041.739

Chemical and physical data
- Formula: C_{22}H_{31}N_{3}O_{5}
- Molar mass: 417.506 g·mol^{−1}
- 3D model (JSmol): Interactive image
- SMILES: O=C(N1CCCC1)CN3CCN(C(=O)\C=C\c2cc(OC)c(OC)c(OC)c2)CC3
- InChI: InChI=1S/C22H31N3O5/c1-28-18-14-17(15-19(29-2)22(18)30-3)6-7-20(26)25-12-10-23(11-13-25)16-21(27)24-8-4-5-9-24/h6-7,14-15H,4-5,8-13,16H2,1-3H3/b7-6+; Key:RCUDFXMNPQNBDU-VOTSOKGWSA-N

Cinepazide or cinepazide maleate (Kelinao or Anjieli in China) is a vasodilator used in China for the treatment of cardiovascular and cerebrovascular diseases, and peripheral vascular diseases. It appears to work by potentiating A2 adenosine receptors.

== History ==
Cinepazide was discovered by scientists at Laboratoires Delalande (now part of Sanofi) in 1969 in an effort to explore useful substituted cinnamoyl-piperazine compounds. The drug, in the form of a pill taken orally, was launched by Delalande in 1976 under the tradename Vasodistal, for treatment of heart failure, balance disorders, cerebrovascular disease, and vascular complications of diabetes. In 1988 the drug was withdrawn from the market in Spain due to risk of agranulocytosis; other countries where the drug was available added warnings to the label. It was withdrawn from the market in France in 1992. The drug had also been marketed in Japan by Daiichi Pharmeceutical Company under the brand name "Brindel" for dementia, but was withdrawn in 1999, following a review by the Japanese regulatory authorities of dementia drugs after a drug, calcium hopantenate, that had been considered the standard of care and against which cinepazide and other dementia drugs had been compared, had failed to demonstrate efficacy in a re-evaluation.

In 2002 Sihuan Pharmaceutical brought an injectable form of the drug to market in China; Sihuan had acquired the drug from a military hospital in China that had developed the formulation. In 2010 it was the highest selling drug in China, with about 1 billion RMB in sales in the 3rd quarter, outselling Plavix in China. This made Sihuan Pharm the largest company in China in the cardio-cerebral vascular drug market in 2010. In 2014 it was the tenth highest-selling drug in China.
