= Topoisomerase inhibitor =

Compounds that inhibit the activity of DNA topoisomerases

Topoisomerase inhibitors are chemical compounds that block the action of topoisomerases, which are broken into two broad subtypes: type I topoisomerases (TopI) and type II topoisomerases (TopII). Topoisomerase plays important roles in cellular reproduction and DNA organization, as they mediate the cleavage of single and double stranded DNA to relax supercoils, untangle catenanes, and condense chromosomes in eukaryotic cells. Topoisomerase inhibitors influence these essential cellular processes. Some topoisomerase inhibitors prevent topoisomerases from performing DNA strand breaks while others, deemed topoisomerase poisons, associate with topoisomerase-DNA complexes and prevent the re-ligation step of the topoisomerase mechanism. These topoisomerase-DNA-inhibitor complexes are cytotoxic agents, as the un-repaired single- and double stranded DNA breaks they cause can lead to apoptosis and cell death. Because of this ability to induce apoptosis, topoisomerase inhibitors have gained interest as therapeutics against infectious and cancerous cells.

== History ==
In the 1940s, great strides were made in the field of antibiotic discovery by researchers like Albert Schatz, Selman A. Waksman, and H. Boyd Woodruff that inspired significant effort to be allocated to the search for novel antibiotics. Studies searching for antibiotic and anticancer agents in the mid to late 20th century have illuminated the existence of numerous unique families of both TopI and TopII inhibitors, with the 1960s alone resulting in the discovery of the camptothecin, anthracycline and epipodophyllotoxin classes. Knowledge of the first topoisomerase inhibitors, and their medical potential as anticancer drugs and antibiotics, predates the discovery of the first topoisomerase (Escherichia. coli omega protein, a TopI) by Jim Wang in 1971. In 1976, Gellert et al. detailed the discovery of the bacterial TopII DNA gyrase and discussed its inhibition when introduced to coumarin and quinolone class inhibitors, sparking greater interest in topoisomerase-targeting antibiotic and antitumor agents. Topoisomerase inhibitors have been used as important experimental tools that have contributed to the discovery of some topoisomerases, as the quinolone nalidixic acid helped elucidate the bacterial TopII proteins it binds to. Topoisomerase inhibitor classes have been derived from a wide variety of disparate sources, with some being natural products first extracted from plants (camptothecin, etoposide) or bacterial samples (doxorubicin, indolocarbazole), while others possess purely synthetic, and often accidental, origins (quinolone, indenoisoquinoline). After their initial discoveries, the structures of these classes have been fine tuned through the creation of derivatives in order to make safer, more effective, and are more easily administered variants. Currently, topoisomerase inhibitors hold a prominent place among antibiotics and anticancer drugs in active medical use, as inhibitors like doxorubicin (anthracycline, TopII inhibitor), etoposide (TopII inhibitor), ciprofloxacin (fluoroquinolone, TopII inhibitor), and irinotecan (camptothecin derivative, TopI inhibitor) were all included in the 2019 WHO Model List for Essential Medicines.

== Topoisomerase I inhibitors ==
=== Mechanism ===
TopI relaxes DNA supercoiling during replication and transcription. Under normal circumstances, TopI attacks the backbone of DNA, forming a transient TopI-DNA intermediate that allows for the rotation of the cleaved strand around the helical axis. TopI then re-ligates the cleaved strand to reestablish duplex DNA. Treatment with TopI inhibitors stabilizes the intermediate cleavable complex, preventing DNA re-ligation, and inducing lethal DNA strand breaks. Camptothecin-derived TopI inhibitors function by forming a ternary complex with TopI-DNA and are able to stack between the base pairs that flank the cleavage site due to their planar structure. Normal cells have multiple DNA checkpoints that can initiate the removal of these stabilized complexes, preventing cell death. In cancer cells, however, these checkpoints are typically inactivated, making them selectively sensitive to TopI inhibitors. Non-camptothecins, such as indenoisoquinolines and indolocarbazoles, also associate with TopI itself, forming hydrogen bonds with residues that typically confer resistance to camptothecin. Indenosioquinolines and indolocarbazoles also lack the lactone ring present in camptothecin, making them more chemically stable and less prone to hydrolysis at biological pH.

=== Anticancer drugs ===
==== Camptothecins ====
Camptothecin (CPT) was first derived from the tree Camptotheca acuminata, native to southern China. It was isolated in a United States Department of Agriculture (USDA) led search for cortisone precursors in the late 1950s and its anticancer activity explored in the early 1960s by Dr. John Hartwell and his team at the Cancer Chemotherapy National Service Center. Clinical trials during the 1970s converted CPT into its sodium salt in order to increase its solubility, however, clinical trials were unsuccessful due to the compound's toxicity. It was not until 1985 that Hsiang et al. deduced via topoisomerase relaxation assays that the anti-tumor activity of CPT was due to its TopI inhibitory activity. Cushman et al. (2000) mentions that due to a lack of observed DNA unwinding in experiments involving CPT and the non-CPT TopI inhibitor indenoisoquinoline, they believed that these inhibitors likely did not function through a mechanism involving DNA intercalation. This hypothesis has been disproved, as X-ray crystallography based models have allowed for the visualization of TopI inhibitor DNA intercalation.

One of important structural feature of CPT is its planar pentacyclic ring and lactone ring (the E-ring). The lactone ring is believed to create the active form of the drug, but it is often prone to hydrolysis, which causes a loss in function. The discovery of CPT led to the synthesis of three currently FDA approved derivatives: topotecan (TPT), irinotecan, and belotecan. TPT is commonly used to treat ovarian and small cell lung cancer (SCLC) while irinotecan is known to improve colon cancer. Commonly, TPT is used in conjunction with a combination of drugs such as cyclophosphamide, doxorubicin, and vincristine. It was noted that IV treatment with TPT had similar response and survival rates to oral medication. Furthermore, it has been shown that TPT treatment with radiotherapy can improve survival rates of patients with brain metastases. Belotecan is a recent CPT derivative used to treat SCLC. Several clinical trials on CPT derivatives such as gimatecan and silatecan continue to progress. Currently, silatecan is in a phase 2 study for the treatment of gliosarcoma in adults who have not had bevacizumab treatment.

==== Non-camptothecins ====
Despite the clinical success of the many CPT derivatives, they require long infusions, have low water solubility, and possess many side effects such as temporary liver dysfunction, severe diarrhea, and bone marrow damage. Additionally, there has been an increase in observed single point mutations that have shown to prompt TopI resistance to CPT. Therefore, three clinically relevant non-CPT inhibitors, indenoisoquinoline, phenanthridines, and indolocarbazoles, are currently being considered by the FDA as possible chemotherapies. Among the non-CPT inhibitors, indolocarbazoles have shown the most promise. These inhibitors have unique advantages compared with the CPT. First, they are more chemically stable due to the absence of the lactone E-ring. Second, indolocarbazoles attach to TopI at different sections of the DNA. Third, this inhibitor expresses less reversibility than CPT. Therefore, they require shorter infusion times because the TopI inhibitor complex is less likely to dissociate. Currently, several other indolocarbazoles are also undergoing clinical trials. Other than indocarbazoles, topovale (ARC-111) is considered one of the most clinically developed phenanthridine. They have been promising in fighting colon cancer, but have shown limited effectiveness against breast cancer.

The first member of the indolocarbazole family of topoisomerase inhibitors, BE-13793C, was discovered in 1991 by Kojiri et al. It was produced by a streptomycete similar to Streptoverticillium mobaraense, and DNA relaxation assays revealed that BE-13793C is capable of inhibiting both TopI and TopII. Soon after, more indolocarbazole variants were found with TopI specificity.

Cushman et al. (1978) details the discovery of the first indenoisoquinoline, indeno[1,2-c]isoquinoline (NSC 314622), which was made accidentally in an attempt to synthesize nitidine chloride, an anticancer agent that does not inhibit topoisomerases. Research on the anticancer activity of indenoisoquinoline ceased until the late 90s as interest grew for CPT class alternatives. Since then, work on developing effective derivatives has been spearheaded by researchers like Dr. Mark Cushman at Purdue University and Dr. Yves Pommier at the National Cancer Institute. As of 2015, indotecan (LMP-400) and indimitecan (LMP-776), derivatives of indeno[1,2-c]isoquinoline, were in phase one clinical trials for the treatment of relapsed solid tumors and lymphomas.

== Topoisomerase II inhibitors ==
=== Mechanism ===
TopII forms a homodimer that functions by cleaving double stranded DNA, winding a second DNA duplex through the gap, and re-ligating the strands. TopII is necessary for cell proliferation and is abundant in cancer cells, which make TopoII inhibitors effective anti-cancer treatments. In addition, some inhibitors, such as quinolones, fluoroquinolones and coumarins, are specific only to bacterial type 2 topoisomerases (TopoIV and gyrase), making them effective antibiotics. Regardless of their clinical use, TopoII inhibitors are classified as either catalytic inhibitors or poisons. TopoII catalytic inhibitors bind the N-terminal ATPase subunit of TopoII, preventing the release of the separated DNA strands from the TopII dimer. The mechanisms of these inhibitors are diverse. For example, ICRF-187 binds non-competitively to the N-terminal ATPase of eukaryotic TopoII, while coumarins bind competitively to the B subunit ATPase of gyrase. Alternatively, TopoII poisons generate lethal DNA strand breaks by either promoting the formation of covalent TopII-DNA cleavage complexes, or by inhibiting re-ligation of the cleaved strand. Some poisons, such as doxorubicin, have been proposed to intercalate in the strand break between the base pairs that flank the TopII-DNA intermediate. Others, such as etoposide, interact with specific amino acids in TopII to from a stable ternary complex with the TopII-DNA intermediate.

=== Antibiotics ===
==== Aminocoumarins ====
Aminocoumarins (coumarins and simocyclinones) and quinolones are the two main classes of TopII inhibitors that function as antibiotics. The aminocoimarins can be further divided into two groups:

1. Traditional coumarin
2. Simocyclioners

The coumarins group, which includes novobiocin and coumermycin, are natural products from the Streptomyces species and target the bacterial enzyme DNA gyrase (TopII). Mechanistically, the inhibitor binds in the B subunit of the gyrase (gyrB) and prevents ATPase activity. This is attributed to the drug creating a stable conformation of the enzyme, which exhibits a low affinity for ATP which is needed for DNA supercoiling. It is proposed that the drug functions as a competitive inhibitor. Thus, at high concentrations, ATP outcompetes the drug. One limitation of traditional coumarins is gyrB ability to confer antibiotic resistance due to mutations and as a result decrease the inhibitor's ability to bind and induce cell death.

Simocyclinones are another class of TopII antibiotics but differ from aminocoumarins in that they are composed of both aminocoumarins and a polyketide element. They also inhibit DNA gyrase's ability to bind to DNA instead of inhibiting ATPase activity, and produces several antibiotic classes. These antibiotics are further divided into two group: actinomycin A and actinomycin B. It was shown that both actinomycin A and actinomycin B were highly effective in killing gram-positive bacteria. Although simocyclinones are effective antibiotics, research has shown that one strain of aimocyclioners, S. antibioticus, cause streptomyces to produce antibiotics.

==== Quinolones ====
Quinolones are amongst the most commonly used antibiotics for bacterial infections in humans, and are used to treat illness such as urinary infections, skin infections, sexually transmitted diseases (STD), tuberculosis, anthrax and septicemic plague. The effectiveness of quinolones is proposed to be from chromosome fragmentation, which initiates the accumulation of reactive oxygen species that leads to apoptosis. Quinolones can be divided into four generations:

1. First generation: nalidixic acid
2. Second generation: cinoxacin, norfloxacin, ciprofloxacin
3. Third generation: levofloxacin, sparfloxacin
4. Fourth generation: moxifloxacin

The first quinolone was discovered in 1962 by George Lesher and his co-workers at Sterling Drug (now owned by Sanofi) as an impurity collected while manufacturing chloroquine, an antimalarial drug. This impurity was used to develop nalidixic acid, which was made clinically available in 1964. Along with its novel structure and mechanism, nalidixic acid's gram negative activity, oral application, and relatively simple synthesis (qualities common among quinolones), showed promise. Despite these features, it was relegated to solely treat urinary tract infections because of its small spectrum of activity. The newer generation of drugs are classified as fluoroquinolones due to the addition of a fluorine and a methyl-piperazine, which allows for improved gyrase targeting (TopII). It is proposed that this added fluorine substituent aids in base stacking during fluoroquinolone intercalation into TopII cleaved DNA by altering the electron density of the quinolone ring. The first member of the fluoroquinolone subclass, norfloxacin, was discovered by Koga and colleagues at the pharmaceutical company Kyorin in 1978. It was found to possess higher anti-gram negative potency than standard quinolones, and showed some anti-gram positive effects. Both its blood serum levels and tissue penetration abilities proved to be poor, and it was overshadowed by the development of ciprofloxacin, a fluoroquinolone with a superior spectrum of activity. Fluoroquinolones have proven to be effective on a wide array of microbial targets, with some third and fourth generation drugs possessing both anti-Gram positive and anti-anerabic capabilities.

Currently, the US Food and Drug Administration (FDA) has updated the public on eight new-generation fluoroquinolones: moxifloxacin, delafloxacin, ciprofloxacin, ciprofloxacin extended-release, gemifloxacin, levofloxacin, and ofloxacin. It was observed that the new fluoroquinolones can cause hypoglycemia, high blood pressure, and mental health effects such as agitation, nervousness, memory impairment and delirium.

Although quinolones are successful as antibiotics, their effectiveness is limited due to accumulation of small mutations and multi-drug efflux mechanisms, which pump out unwanted drugs out of the cell. In particular, smaller quinolones have shown to bind with high affinity in the multi-drug efflux pump in Escherichia coli and Staphylococcus aureus. Despite quinolones ability to target TopII, they can also inhibit TopIV based on the organisms and type of quinolone. Additionally, the discovery of mutations in the gyrB region is hypothesized to cause quinolone-based antibiotic resistance. Specifically, the mutations from aspartate (D) to asparagine (N), and Lysine (K) to glutamic acid (E) are believed to disrupt interactions, leading to some loss of tertiary structure.

Mechanically, the since disproven, Shen et al. (1989) model of quinolone inhibitor binding proposed that, in each DNAgyrase-DNA complex, four quinolone molecules associate with one another via hydrophobic interactions and form hydrogen bonds with the bases of separated, single stranded segments of DNA. Shen et al. based their hypothesis on observations regarding the increased affinity and site specificity of quinolone binding to single stranded DNA compared to relaxed double stranded DNA. A modified version of the Shen et al. model was still regarded as a likely mechanism in the mid to late 2000s, but X-ray crystallography-based models of inhibitor-DNA-TopII complex stable intermediates developed in 2009 have since contradicted this hypothesis. This newer model suggests that two quinolone molecules intercalate at the two DNA nick sites created by TopII, aligning with a hypothesis proposed by Leo et al. (2005).

=== Anticancer therapeutics ===
==== Intercalating poison ====
TopII inhibitors have two main identification: poisons and catalytic inhibitors. TopII poisons are characterized by their ability to create irreversible covalent bonds with DNA. Furthermore, TopII poisons are divided into two groups: intercalating or non-intercalating poisons. The anthracycline family, one of the most medically prevalent types of intercalating poisons, are able to treat a variety of cancer due to its diverse derivations and are often prescribed in combination with other chemotherapeutic medications.

The first anthracycline (doxorubicin) was isolated from the bacteria Streptomyces peucetius in the 1960s. Anthracyclines are composed of a core of four 6-member rings, the central two of which are quinone and hydroquinone rings. A ring adjacent to the hydroquinone is connected to two substituents, a daunosamine sugar and a carbonyl with a varying side chain. Currently, there are four main anthracyclines in medical use:

1. Doxorubicin
2. Daunorubicin (doxorubicin precursor)
3. Epirubicin (a doxorubicin stereoisomer)
4. Idarubicin (a daunorubicin derivative)

Idarubicin is able to pass through cell membranes easier than daunorubicin and doxorubicin because it possesses less polar subunits, making it more lipophilic. It is hypothesized that doxorubicin, which possesses a hydroxyl group and a methoxy group not present in idarubicin, can form hydrogen bonding aggregates with itself on the surface of phospholipid membranes, further reducing its ability to enter cells.

Despite the success of these poisons, they have been shown that interaction poisons have a few limitations including 1) little inhibitor success of small compounds 2) anthracyclines' adverse effects such as membrane damage and secondary cancers due to oxygen-free radical generation 3) congestive heart failure. The harmful oxygen free radical generation associated with the use of doxorubicin and other anthracyclines stems, in part, from their quinone moiety undergoing redox reactions mediated by oxido-reductases, resulting in the formation of superoxide anions, hydrogen peroxide, and hydroxyl radicals. The mitochondrial electron transport chain pathway containing NADH hydrogenase is one potential instigator of these redox reactions. The reactive oxygen species produced by interactions like this can interfere with cell signaling pathways that utilize protein kinase A, protein kinase C and calcium/calmodulin-dependent protein kinase II (CaMKII), a kinase integral in controlling calcium ion channels in cardiomyocites.

==== Non-intercalating poisons ====
Another category of TopII poisons is known as non-intercalating poisons. The main non-intercalating TopII poisons are etoposide and teniposide. These non-intercalating poisons specifically target prokaryotic TopII in DNA by blocking transcription and replication. Studies have shown that non-intercalating poisons play an important role in confining TopII-DNA covalent complexes. Etoposide, a semi-synthetic derivative of epipodophyllotoxin is commonly used to study this apoptotic mechanism and include:

1. Etoposide
2. Teniposide

Both etoposide and teniposide are naturally occurring semi-synthetic derivatives of podophyllotoxins and are important anti-cancer drugs that function to inhibit TopII activity. Etoposide is synthesized from podophyllum extracts found in the North American May Apple plant and the North American Mandrake plant. More specifically, Podophyllotoxins are spindle poisons that cause inhibition of mitosis by blocking mitrotubular assembly. In relation, etoposide functions to inhibit the cell cycle progression at the pre-mitotic stage (late S and G2) by breaking strands of DNA via the interaction with DNA and TopII or by the formation of free radicals. Etoposide has shown to be one of the most active drugs for small cell lung cancer (SCLC), testicular carcinoma and malignant lymphoma. Studies have indicated that some major therapeutic activity for the drug has been found in small cell bronchogenic carcinoma, germ cell malignancies, acute non-lymphocytic leukemia, Hodgkin's disease and non-Hodgkin's lymphoma. Additionally, studies have shown when treated with etoposide derivatives there is an anti-leukemic dose response that differ compared to the normal hematopoietic elements. Etoposide is a highly schedule-dependent drug and is typically administered orally and recommended to take twice the dosage for effective treatment. However, with the selective dosage, etoposide treatment is dose limiting proposing toxic effects like myelosupression (leukopenia) and primarily hematologic. Furthermore, around 20-30% of patients who take the recommended dosage can have hematologic symptoms such as alopecia, nausea, vomiting and stomatitis. Despite the side effects, etoposide has demonstrated activity in many diseases and could contribute in combination chemotherapeutic regimens for these cancer related diseases.

Similarly, teniposide is another drug that helps treat leukemia. Teniposide functions very similarly to etoposide in that they are both phase specific and act during the late S and early G2 phases of the cell cycle. However, teniposide is more protein-bound than etoposide. Additionally, teniposide has a greater uptake, higher potency and greater binding affinity to cells compared to etoposide. Studies have shown that teniposide is an active anti-tumor agent and have been used in clinical settings to evaluate the efficacy of teniposide. In a study performed by the European Organization for the Research and Treatment of Cancer (EORTC) and Lung Cancer Cooperative Group (LCCG), the results of toxicity of teniposide indicated hematologic and mild symptoms similar to etoposide. However, the study found that the treatment outcome for patients with brain metastasis of SCLC had low survival and improvement rates.

==== Mutations ====
Although the function of TopII poisons are not completely understood there is evidence that there is differences in structural specificity between intercalating and non-intercalating poisons. It is known that the difference between the two classifications of poisons rely on their biological activity and its role in the formation of the TopII-DNA covalent complexes. More specifically, this difference occurs between the chromophore framework and the base pairs of DNA. As a result of their structural specificity, slight differences in chemical amplification between antibiotics are seen. Thus, this provides explanation on why theses drugs show differences in clinical activity in patients.

Despite the difference in structural specificity, they both present mutations that result in anticancer drug resistance In relation to intercalating poisons, it has been found that there are recurrent somatic mutations in the anthracyclines family. Studies have shown that in DNA methyltransferase 3A (DNMT3A) the most frequent mutation is seen at arginine 882 (DNMT3AR882). This mutation impacts patients with acute myeloid leukemia (AML) by initially responding to chemotherapy but relapsing afterwards. The persistence of DNMT3AR882 cells induce hematopoietic stem cell expansion and promotes resistance to anthracycline chemotherapy.

While there has not been enough research on specific mutations occurring among non-intercalating poisons, some studies have presented data regarding resistance to etoposide specifically in human leukemia cells (HL-60). R. Ganapathi et al. reported that the alteration in activity of TopII as well as a reduced drug accumulation effect tumor cell resistance to epipodophyllotoxins and anthracyclines. It has been proposed that the level of TopII activity is an important determination factor in drug sensitivity. This study also indicated that hypophosphorylation of TopII in HL-60 cells when treated with calcium chelator (1,2-bis-(2-aminophenoxy)ethane-N,N,N',N'-tetraacetic acid acetoxymethyl ester) resulted in a > 2-fold reduction in etoposide-induced TopII-mediated DNA cleavable complex formation. Scientists have indicated that this could be a plausible relationship between etoposide drug resistance and hypophosphorylation of HL-60 cells. Additionally, a study reported by Yoshihito Matsumoto et al. showed an incidence of mutation and deletion in TopIIα mRNA of etoposide and m-amsacrine (mAMSA)-resistant cell lines. TopIIα showed a decrease in activity and expression and an increase of multidrug resistance protein (MRP) levels. As a result, this diminished the intracellular target to etoposide and other TopII poisons. Furthermore, it was found that phosphorylation of TopIIα from the resistant cells was more hypophsophorylated compared to the parental cells as well as loss of phosphorylation sites located in the C-terminal domain. Other sources have seen this same trend and have reported hyperphosphorylation of TopII in etoposide-resistant cells and that the TopIIα located in these etoposide-resistant cells have a mutation at the amino acid residues Ser861-Phe.

==== Catalytic inhibitors ====
Catalytic inhibitors are the other main identification of TopII inhibitors. Common catalytic inhibitors are Bisdioxopiperazine compounds and sometimes act competitively against TopII poisons. They function to target enzymes inside the cell thus inhibiting genetic processes such as DNA replication, and chromosome dynamics. Additionally, catalytic poisons can interfere with ATPase and DNA strand passageways leading to stabilization of the DNA intermediate covalent complex. Because of these unique functions, research has suggested that bis(2,6-dioxopiperazines) could potentially solve issues with cardiac toxicity caused by anti-tumor antibiotics. Furthermore, in preclinical and clinical settings, bis(2,6-dioxopiperazines) is used to reduce the side effects of TopII poisons. Common catalytic inhibitors that target TopII are dexrazoxane, novobiocin, merbarone and anthrycycline aclarubicin.

1. Dexrazoxane
2. Novobiocin
3. Merbarone
4. Anthrycycline aclarubicin

Dexrazoxane also known as ICRF-187 is currently the only clinically approved drug used in cancer patients to target and prevent anthrycycline mediated cardiotoxicity as well as prevent tissue injuries post extravasation of anthrocyclines. Dexrazoxane functions to inhibit TopII and its effects on iron homeostasis regulation. Dexrazoxane is a bisdioxopiperazine with iron-chelating, chemoprotective, cardioprotective, and antineoplastic activities.

Novobiocin is also known as cathomycin, albamycin or streptonivicin and is an aminocoumarin antibiotic compound that functions to bind to DNA gyrase and inhibits ATPase activity. It acts as a competitive inhibitor and specifically inhibits Hsp90 and TopII. Novobiocin has been investigated and used in metastatic breast cancer clinical trials, non-small lung cancer cells and treatments for psoriasis when combined with nalidixic acid. Additionally, it is regularly used as a treatment for infections by gram-positive bacteria. Novobiocin is derived from coumarin and the structure of novobiocin is similar to that of coumarin.

== Synthetic lethality with deficient WRN expression ==
Synthetic lethality arises when a combination of deficiencies in the expression of two or more genes leads to cell death, whereas a deficiency in expression of only one of these genes does not. The deficiencies can arise through mutations, epigenetic alterations or inhibitors of the genes. Synthetic lethality with the topoisomerase inhibitor irinotecan appears to occur when given to cancer patients with deficient expression of the DNA repair gene WRN.

The analysis of 630 human primary tumors in 11 tissues shows that hypermethylation of the WRN CpG island promoter (with loss of expression of WRN protein) is a common event in tumorigenesis. WRN is repressed in about 38% of colorectal cancers and non-small-cell lung carcinomas and in about 20% or so of stomach cancers, prostate cancers, breast cancers, non-Hodgkin lymphomas and chondrosarcomas, plus at significant levels in the other cancers evaluated. The WRN protein helicase is important in homologous recombinational DNA repair and also has roles in non-homologous end joining DNA repair and base excision DNA repair.

A 2006 retrospective study, with long clinical follow-up, was made of colon cancer patients treated with the topoisomerase inhibitor irinotecan. In this study, 45 patients had hypermethylated WRN gene promoters and 43 patients had unmethylated WRN promoters. Irinotecan was more strongly beneficial for patients with hypermethylated WRN promoters (39.4 months survival) than for those with unmethylated WRN promoters (20.7 months survival). Thus, a topoisomerase inhibitor appeared to be especially synthetically lethal with deficient WRN expression. Further evaluations have also indicated synthetic lethality of deficient expression of WRN and topoisomerase inhibitors.

== Bibliography ==
- Antony S, Agama KK, Miao ZH, Takagi K, Wright MH, Robles AI, Varticovski L, Nagarajan M, Morrell A, Cushman M, Pommier Y (Nov 2007). "Novel indenoisoquinolines NSC 725776 and NSC 724998 produce persistent topoisomerase I cleavage complexes and overcome multidrug resistance". Cancer Res. 67 (21): 10397–405. doi:10.1158/0008-5472.can-07-0938. PMID 17974983.
- Antony S, Agama KK, Miao ZH, Hollingshead M, Holbeck SL, Wright MH, Varticovski L, Nagarajan M, Morrell A, Cushman M, Pommier Y (2006). "Bisindenoisoquinoline bis-1,3-{(5,6-dihydro-5,11-diketo-11H-indeno[1,2-c]isoquinoline)-6-propylamino}propane bis(trifluoroacetate) (NSC 727357), a DNA intercalator and topoisomerase inhibitor with antitumor activity". Mol. Pharmacol. 70 (3): 1109–1120. doi:10.1124/mol.106.024372. PMID 16798938. S2CID 15829471.
- Antony S, Kohlhagen G, Agama K, Jayaraman M, Cao S, Durrani FA, Rustum YM, Cushman M, Pommier Y (Feb 2005). "Cellular topoisomerase I inhibition and antiproliferative activity by MJ-III-65 (NSC 706744), an indenoisoquinoline topoisomerase I poison". Mol. Pharmacol. 67 (2): 523–30. doi:10.1124/mol.104.003889. PMID 15531731. S2CID 6220324.
- Antony S, Jayaraman M, Laco G, Kohlhagen G, Kohn KW, Cushman M, Pommier Y (Nov 2003). "Differential induction of topoisomerase I-DNA cleavage complexes by the indenoisoquinoline MJ-III-65 (NSC 706744) and camptothecin: base sequence analysis and activity against camptothecin-resistant topoisomerases I.". Cancer Res. 63 (21): 7428–35. PMID 14612542.
- Bakshi RP, Sang D, Morrell A, Cushman M, Shapiro TA (Jan 2009). "Activity of indenoisoquinolines against African trypanosomes". Antimicrob. Agents Chemother. 53 (1): 123–8. doi:10.1128/aac.00650-07. PMC 2612167. PMID 18824603.
- Baxter J, Diffley JF (Jun 2008). "Topoisomerase II inactivation prevents the completion of DNA replication in budding yeast". Molecular Cell. 30 (6): 790–802. doi:10.1016/j.molcel.2008.04.019. PMID 18570880.
- Burgess DJ, Doles J, Zender L, Xue W, Ma B, McCombie WR, Hannon GJ, Lowe SW, Hemann MT (Jul 2008). "Topoisomerase levels determine chemotherapy response in vitro and in vivo". Proc. Natl. Acad. Sci. USA. 105 (26): 9053–8. Bibcode:2008PNAS..105.9053B. doi:10.1073/pnas.0803513105. PMC 2435590. PMID 18574145.
- Cho WJ, Le QM, My Van HT, Youl Lee K, Kang BY, Lee ES, Lee SK, Kwon Y (Jul 2007). "Design, docking, and synthesis of novel indeno[1,2-c]isoquinolines for the development of antitumor agents as topoisomerase I inhibitors". Bioorg. Med. Chem. Lett. 17 (13): 3531–4. doi:10.1016/j.bmcl.2007.04.064. PMID 17498951.
- Cinelli MA, Cordero B, Dexheimer TS, Pommier Y, Cushman M (Oct 2009). "Synthesis and biological evaluation of 14-(aminoalkyl-aminomethyl)aromathecins as topoisomerase I inhibitors: investigating the hypothesis of shared structure-activity relationships". Bioorg. Med. Chem. 17 (20): 7145–55. doi:10.1016/j.bmc.2009.08.066. PMC 2769207. PMID 19783447.
- Cinelli MA, Morrell AE, Dexheimer TS, Agama K, Agrawal S, Pommier Y, Cushman M (Aug 2010). "The structure-activity relationships of A-ring-substituted aromathecin topoisomerase I inhibitors strongly support a camptothecin-like binding mode". Bioorg. Med. Chem. 18 (15): 5535–52. doi:10.1016/j.bmc.2010.06.040. PMC 2911012. PMID 20630766.
- Cinelli MA, Morrell A, Dexheimer TS, Scher ES, Pommier Y, Cushman C (Aug 2008). "Design, synthesis, and biological evaluation of 14-substituted aromathecins as Topoisomerase I inhibitors". J. Med. Chem. 51 (15): 4609–19. doi:10.1021/jm800259e. PMC 2538619. PMID 18630891.
- Cushman M, Jayaraman M, Vroman JA, Fukunaga AK, Fox BM, Kohlhagen G, Strumberg D, Pommier Y (Oct 2000). "Synthesis of new indeno[1,2-c]isoquinolines: cytotoxic non-camptothecin topoisomerase I inhibitors". J. Med. Chem. 43 (20): 3688–98. doi:10.1021/jm000029d. PMID 11020283.
- Holleran JL, Parise RA, Yellow-Duke AE, Egorin MJ, Eiseman JL, Covey JM, Beumer JH (Sep 2010). "Liquid chromatography-tandem mass spectrometric assay for the quantitation in human plasma of the novel indenoisoquinoline topoisomerase I inhibitors, NSC 743400 and NSC 725776". J. Pharm. Biomed. Anal. 52 (5): 714–20. doi:10.1016/j.jpba.2010.02.020. PMC 2865235. PMID 20236781.
- Ioanoviciu A, Antony S, Pommier Y, Staker BL, Stewart L, Cushman M (2005). "Synthesis and mechanism of action studies of a series of norindenoisoquinoline topoisomerase I poisons reveal an inhibitor with a flipped orientation in the ternary DNA-enzyme-inhibitor complex as determined by X-ray crystallographic analysis". J. Med. Chem. 48 (15): 4803–14. doi:10.1021/jm050076b. PMID 16033260.
- Kinders RJ, Hollingshead M, Lawrence S, Ji J, Tabb B, Bonner WM, Pommier Y, Rubinstein L, Evrard YA, Parchment RE, Tomaszewski J, Doroshow JH (Nov 2010). "Development of a validated immunofluorescence assay for yH2AX as a pharmacodynamic marker of topoisomerase I inhibitor activity". Clin. Cancer Res. 16 (22): 5447–57. doi:10.1158/1078-0432.ccr-09-3076. PMC 2982895. PMID 20924131.
- Kiselev E, Dexheimer TS, Pommier Y, Cushman M (Dec 2010). "Design, synthesis, and evaluation of dibenzo[c,h][1,6]naphthyridines as topoisomerase I inhibitors and potential anticancer agents". J. Med. Chem. 53 (24): 8716–26. doi:10.1021/jm101048k. PMC 3064471. PMID 21090809.
- Marchand C, Antony S, Kohn KW, Cushman M, Ioanoviciu A, Staker BL, Burgin AB, Stewart L, Pommier Y (Feb 2006). "A novel norindenoisoquinoline structure reveals a common interfacial inhibitor paradigm for ternary trappingof topoisomerase I-DNA covalent complexes". Mol. Cancer Ther. 5 (2): 287–95. doi:10.1158/1535-7163.mct-05-0456. PMC 2860177. PMID 16505102.
- Morrell A, Placzek M, Parmley S, Grella B, Antony S, Pommier Y, Cushman M (Sep 2007). "Optimization of the indenone ring of indenoisoquinoline topoisomerase I inhibitors". J. Med. Chem. 50 (18): 4388–404. doi:10.1021/jm070307+. PMID 17676830.
- Morrell A, Placzek M, Parmley S, Antony S, Dexheimer TS, Pommier Y, Cushman M (Sep 2007). "Nitrated indenoisoquinolines as topoisomerase I inhibitors: a systematic study and optimization". J. Med. Chem. 50 (18): 4419–30. doi:10.1021/jm070361q. PMID 17696418.
- Morrell A, Jayaraman M, Nagarajan M, Fox BM, Meckley MR, Ioanoviciu A, Pommier Y, Antony S, Hollingshead M, Cushman M (Aug 2006). "Evaluation of indenoisoquinoline topoisomerase I inhibitors usinga hollow fiber assay". Bioorg. Med. Chem. Lett. 16 (16): 4395–9. doi:10.1016/j.bmcl.2006.05.048. PMID 16750365.
- Nagarajan M, Morrell A, Antony S, Kohlhagen G, Agama K, Pommier Y, Ragazzon PA, Garbett NC, Chaires JB, Hollingshead M, Cushman M (Aug 2006). "Synthesis and biological evaluation of bisindenoisoquinolines as topoisomerase I inhibitors". J. Med. Chem. 49 (17): 5129–40. doi:10.1021/jm060046o. PMID 16913702.
- Nagarajan M, Xiao X, Antony S, Kohlhagen G, Pommier Y, Cushman M (2003). "Design, synthesis, and biological evaluation of indenoisoquinoline topoisomerase I inhibitors featuring polyamine side chains on the lactam nitrogen". J. Med. Chem. 46 (26): 5712–24. doi:10.1021/jm030313f. PMID 14667224.
- Pfister TD, Reinhold WC, Agama K, Gupta S, Khin SA, Kinders RJ, Parchment RE, Tomaszewski JE, Doroshow JH, Pommier Y (Jul 2009). "Topoisomerase I levels in the NCI-60 cancer cell line panel determined by validated ELISA and microarray analysis and correlation with indenoisoquinoline sensitivity". Mol. Cancer Ther. 8 (7): 1878–84. doi:10.1158/1535-7163.mct-09-0016. PMC 2728499. PMID 19584232.
- Pommier Y, Cushman M (May 2009). "The indenoisoquinoline noncamptothecin topoisomerase I inhibitors: update and perspectives". Mol. Cancer Ther. 8 (5): 1008–14. doi:10.1158/1535-7163.mct-08-0706. PMC 2888777. PMID 19383846.
- Pommier Y, Leo E, Zhang H, Marchand C (May 2010). "DNA topoisomerases and their poisoning by anticancer and antibacterial drugs". Chem. Biol. 17 (5): 421–33. doi:10.1016/j.chembiol.2010.04.012. PMC 7316379. PMID 20534341.
- Pommier Y (Jul 2009). "DNA topoisomerase I inhibitors: chemistry, biology, and interfacial inhibition". Chem. Rev. 109 (7): 2894–902. doi:10.1021/cr900097c. PMC 2707511. PMID 19476377.
- Pommier Y (2006). "Topoisomerase I inhibitors: camptothecins and beyond". Nat. Rev. Cancer. 6 (10): 789–802. doi:10.1038/nrc1977. PMID 16990856. S2CID 25135019.
- Pommier Y (2004). "Camptothecins and topoisomerase I: a foot in the door. Targeting the genome beyond topoisomerase I with camptothecins and novel anticancer drugs: importance of DNA replication, repair and cell cycle checkpoints". Curr. Med. Chem. Anti-Cancer Agents. 4 (5): 429–34. doi:10.2174/1568011043352777. PMID 15379698. S2CID 1468756.
- Song Y, Shao Z, Dexheimer TS, Scher ES, Pommier Y, Cushman M (Mar 2010). "Structure-based design, synthesis, and biological studies of new anticancer norindenoisoquinoline topoisomerase I inhibitors". J. Med. Chem. 53 (5): 1979–89. doi:10.1021/jm901649x. PMC 2838169. PMID 20155916.
- Sordet O, Goldman A, Redon C, Solier S, Rao VA, Pommier Y (Aug 2008). "Topoisomerase I requirement for death receptor-induced apoptotic nuclear fission". J. Biol. Chem. 283 (34): 23200–8. doi:10.1074/jbc.m801146200. PMC 2516995. PMID 18556653.
- Staker BL, Feese MD, Cushman M, Pommier Y, Zembower D, Stewart L, Burgin AB (Apr 2005). "Structures of three classes of anticancer agents bound to the human topoisomerase I-DNA covalent complex". J. Med. Chem. 48 (7): 2336–45. doi:10.1021/jm049146p. PMID 15801827.
- Teicher BA (2008). "Next generation topoisomerase I inhibitors: rationale and biomarker strategies". Biochem. Pharmacol. 75 (6): 1262–71. doi:10.1016/j.bcp.2007.10.016. PMID 18061144.
- Seng CH, Chen YL, Lu PJ, Yang CN, Tzeng CC (2008). "Synthesis and antiproliferative evaluation of certain indeno[1,2-c]quinoline derivatives". Bioorg. Med. Chem. 16 (6): 3153–62. doi:10.1016/j.bmc.2007.12.028. PMID 18180162.
- Tuduri S, Crabbé L, Conti C, Tourrière H, Holtgreve-Grez H, Jauch A, Pantesco V, DeVos J, Thomas A, Theillet C, Pommier Y, Tazi J, Coquelle A, Pasero P (Nov 2009). "Topoisomerase I suppresses genomic instability by preventing interference between replication and transcription". Nat. Cell Biol. 11 (11): 1315–24. doi:10.1038/ncb1984. PMC 2912930. PMID 19838172.
- Van HT, Le QM, Lee KY, Lee ES, Kwon Y, Kim TS, Le TN, Lee SH, Cho WJ (Nov 2007). "Convenient synthesis of indeno[1,2-c]isoquinolines as constrained forms of 3-arylisoquinolines and docking study of a topoisomerase I inhibitor into DNA-topoisomerase I complex". Bioorg Med Chem Lett. 17 (21): 5763–7. doi:10.1016/j.bmcl.2007.08.062. PMID 17827007.
- Nagarajan M., Morrell A., Ioanoviciu A., Antony S., Kohlhagen G., Hollingshead M., Pommier Y., Cushman M. (2006). "Synthesis and Evaluation of Indenoisoquinoline Topoisomerase I Inhibitors Substituted with Nitrogen Heterocycles". J. Med. Chem. 49 (21): 6283–6289. doi:10.1021/jm060564z. PMC 2526314. PMID 17034134.
