= Epipodophyllotoxin =

Etoposide, an epipodophyllotoxin

Epipodophyllotoxins are substances naturally occurring in the root of American Mayapple plant (Podophyllum peltatum).

Some epipodophyllotoxin derivatives are currently used in the treatment of cancer. These include etoposide and teniposide. They act as anti-cancer drugs by inhibiting topoisomerase II.

== See also ==
- Podophyllotoxin
