= Streptomyces niveus =

Scientific classification
- Domain: Bacteria
- Kingdom: Bacillati
- Phylum: Actinomycetota
- Class: Actinomycetes
- Order: Streptomycetales
- Family: Streptomycetaceae
- Genus: Streptomyces
- Species: S. niveus

Binomial name
- Streptomyces niveus Smith et al. 1956

Type strain
- AS 4.1370, ATCC 19793, BCRC 11514, CBS 426.61, CBS 545.68, CCRC 11514, CCUG 11108, CGMCC 4.1370, CGMCC AS 4.1370, DSM 40088, ETH 28497, IFM 1181, IFO 12804, IMET 43503, ISP 5088, JCM 4251, JCM 4599, KCC S-0251, KCC S-0599, KCCS-0251, KCCS-0599, Lanoot R-8767, LMG 19395, LMG 598, MTCC 2525, NBRC 12804, NCIB 9219, NCIM 2502, NCIMB 9219, NRRL 2466, NRRL B-2466, NRRL-ISP 5088, R-8767, RIA 1072, UNIQEM 179

Synonyms
- Streptomyces laceyi Manfio et al., 2003; Streptomyces spheroides Wallick et al., 1956

Species of bacterium

Streptomyces niveus is a bacterium species from the genus of Streptomyces which has been isolated from soil in the United States. Streptomyces niveus produces the aminocoumarin antibiotic novobiocin and the compounds nivetetracyclate A and nivetetracyclate B.

== See also ==
- List of Streptomyces species
