= Streptomyces rishiriensis =

Scientific classification
- Domain: Bacteria
- Kingdom: Bacillati
- Phylum: Actinomycetota
- Class: Actinomycetes
- Order: Streptomycetales
- Family: Streptomycetaceae
- Genus: Streptomyces
- Species: S. rishiriensis

Binomial name
- Streptomyces rishiriensis Kawaguchi et al. 1965

Type strain
- 404 Y3, A-9795, ATCC 14812, BCRC 12333, CBS 708.72, CCRC 12333, CGMCC 4.1793, DSM 40489, IFO 13407, IMET 43843, ISP 5489, JCM 4821, Kawaguchi404Y3, KCC S-0821, KCCS-0821, LMG 20297, NBRC 13407, NCIB 11890, NCIMB 11890, NRRL B-3239, NRRL-ISP 5489, ptcc1145, RIA 1368, VKM Ac-1188

Synonyms
- Streptomyces hazeliensis

Species of bacterium

Streptomyces rishiriensis is a bacterium species from the genus of Streptomyces which has been isolated from soil in Hokkaido in Japan. Streptomyces rishiriensis produces coumermycin A1, notomycin, 2-chloroadenosine, phosphophenylalanarginine and lactonamycin.

== See also ==
- List of Streptomyces species
