= Type II topoisomerase =

Class of enzymes

DNA Topoisomerase II (ATP-hydrolyzing)
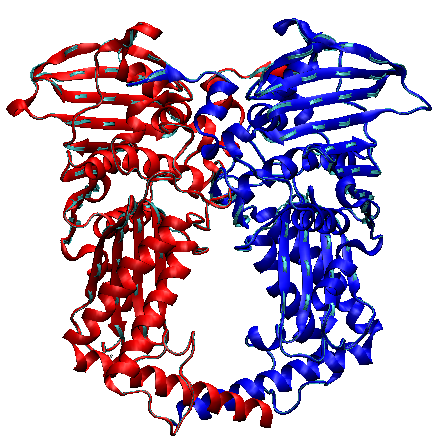
- Structure of the 42 KDa fragment of the N-terminal ATPase and transducer domains of DNA gyrase homologous to all other type IIA topoisomerases.

Identifiers
- EC no.: 5.6.2.2

Databases
- BRENDA: enzyme data
- ExPASy: NiceZyme view
- KEGG: enzyme entry
- MetaCyc: metabolic pathway
- Rhea: reactions
- PDB structures: RCSB PDB PDBe PDBsum
Search
- PMC: articles
- PubMed: articles
- NCBI: proteins

Type II topoisomerases are topoisomerases that cut both strands of the DNA helix simultaneously in order to manage DNA tangles and supercoils. They use the hydrolysis of ATP, unlike Type I topoisomerase. In this process, these enzymes change the linking number of circular DNA by ±2. Topoisomerases are ubiquitous enzymes, found in all living organisms.

In animals, topoisomerase II is a chemotherapy target. In prokaryotes, gyrase is an antibacterial target. Indeed, these enzymes are of interest for a wide range of effects.

== Function ==
Type II topoisomerases increase or decrease the linking number of a DNA loop by 2 units, and it promotes chromosome disentanglement. For example, DNA gyrase, a type II topoisomerase observed in E. coli and most other prokaryotes, introduces negative supercoils and decreases the linking number by 2. Gyrase is also able to remove knots from the bacterial chromosome. Along with gyrase, most prokaryotes also contain a second type IIA topoisomerase, termed topoisomerase IV. Gyrase and topoisomerase IV differ by their C-terminal domains, which is believed to dictate substrate specificity and functionality for these two enzymes. Footprinting indicates that gyrase, which forms a 140-base-pair footprint and wraps DNA, introduces negative supercoils, while topoisomerase IV, which forms a 28-base-pair footprint, does not wrap DNA.

Eukaryotic type II topoisomerase cannot introduce supercoils; it can only relax them.

The roles of type IIB topoisomerases are less understood. Unlike type IIA topoisomerases, type IIB topoisomerases cannot simplify DNA topology (see below), but they share several structural features with type IIA topoisomerases.

== Topology simplification ==
Type IIA topoisomerases are essential in the separation of entangled daughter strands during replication. This function is believed to be performed by topoisomerase II in eukaryotes and by topoisomerase IV in prokaryotes. Failure to separate these strands leads to cell death. Type IIA topoisomerases have the special ability to relax DNA to a state below that of thermodynamic equilibrium, a feature unlike type IA, IB, and IIB topoisomerases. This ability, known as topology simplification, was first identified by Rybenkov et al. The hydrolysis of ATP drives this simplification, but a clear molecular mechanism for this simplification is still lacking. Several models to explain this phenomenon have been proposed, including two models that rely on the ability of type IIA topoisomerases to recognize bent DNA duplexes. Biochemistry, electron microscopy, and recent structures of topoisomerase II bound to DNA reveal that type IIA topoisomerases bind at the apices of DNA, supporting this model.

== Classification ==
There are two subclasses of type II topoisomerases, type IIA and IIB.

- Type IIA topoisomerases include the enzymes DNA gyrase, eukaryotic topoisomerase II (topo II), and bacterial topoisomerase IV (topo IV). These enzymes span all domains of life and are essential for function.
- Type IIB topoisomerases are structurally and biochemically distinct, and comprise a single family member, topoisomerase VI (topo VI). Type IIB topoisomerases are found in archaea and some higher plants.

Some organisms including humans have two isoforms of topoisomerase II: alpha and beta. In cancers, the topoisomerase IIα is highly expressed in proliferating cells. In certain cancers, such as peripheral nerve sheath tumors, high expression of its encoded protein is also associated to poor patient survival.

The two classes of topoisomerases possess a similar strand passage mechanism and domain structure (see below), however they also have several important differences. Type IIA topoisomerases form double-stranded breaks with four-base pair overhangs, while type IIB topoisomerases form double-stranded breaks with two base overhangs. In addition, type IIA topoisomerases are able to simplify DNA topology, while type IIB topoisomerases do not.

== Structure ==
=== Type IIA ===
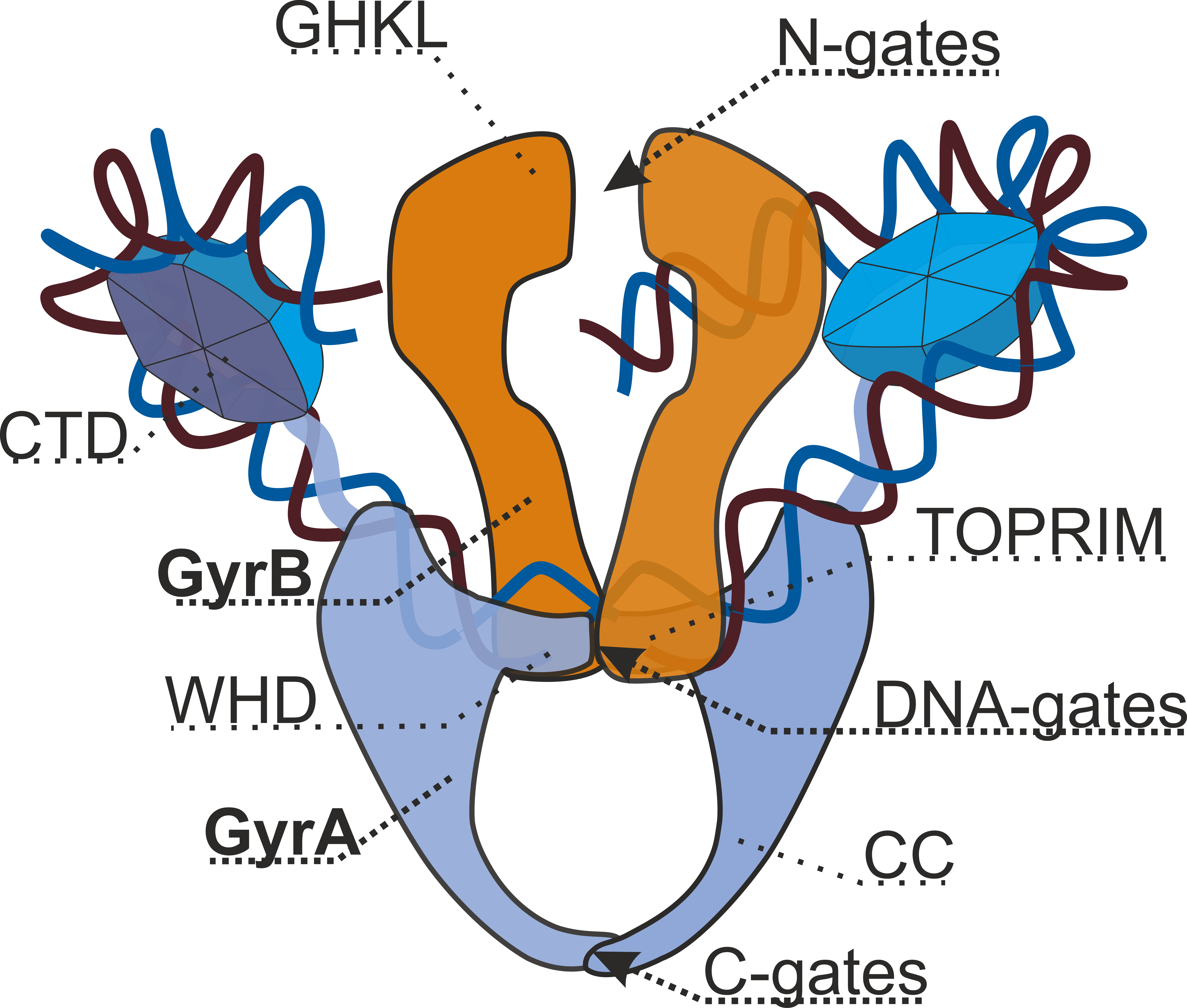
Schematic structure of gyrase, oriented upside-down compared to the other examples in this article.

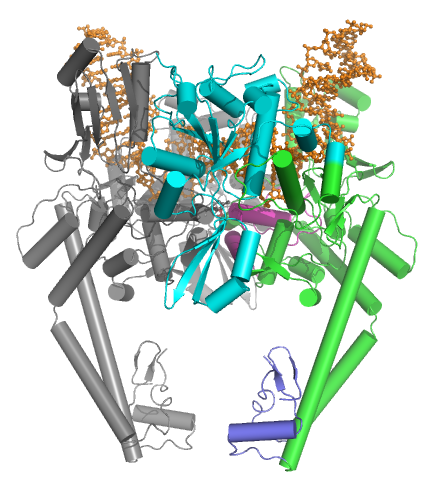
Structure of yeast topoisomerase II bound to a doubly nicked 34-mer duplex DNA (PDB: 2RGR). The Toprim fold is colored cyan; the DNA is colored orange; the HTH is colored magenta; and the C-gate is colored purple. Notice that the DNA is bent by ~160 degrees through an invariant isoleucine (Ile833 in yeast).

Type IIA topoisomerases consist of several key motifs:

- an N-terminal GHKL ATPase domain (for gyrase, Hsp, kinase and MutL),
- a Toprim domain (a Rossmann fold subclass), which exists in both type II topoisomerases, type IA topoisomerases, and bacterial primase (DnaG),
- a central DNA-binding core (which structurally forms a heart-shaped structure), and
- a variable C-terminal domain.

Eukaryotic type II topoisomerases are homodimers (A_{2}), while prokaryotic type II topoisomerases are heterotetramers (A_{2}B_{2}). Prokaryotes have the ATPase domain and the Toprim fold on one polypeptide (Pfam PF00204), while the DNA cleavage core and the CTD lies on a second polypeptide (Pfam PF00521). For gyrase, the first polypeptide is called GyrB and the second polypeptide is called GyrA. For topo IV, the first polypeptide is called ParE and the second polypeptide is called ParC. Both Pfam signatures are found in the single-chain eukayotic topoisomerase.

The structures of the N-terminal ATPase domain of gyrase and yeast topoisomerase II have been solved in complex with AMPPNP (an ATP analogue), showing that two ATPase domains dimerize to form a closed conformation. For gyrase, the structure has a substantial hole in the middle, which is presumed to accommodate the T-segment.

Linking the ATPase domain to the Toprim fold is a helical element known as the transducer domain. This domain is thought to communicate the nucleotide state of the ATPase domain to the rest of the protein. Modifications to this domain affect topoisomerase activity, and structural work done by the Verdine group shows that the ATP state affects the orientation of the transducer domain.

The central core of the protein contains a Toprim fold and a DNA-binding core that contains a winged helix domain (WHD), often referred to as a CAP domain, since it was first identified to resemble the WHD of catabolite activator protein. The catalytic tyrosine lies on this WHD. The Toprim fold is a Rossmann fold that contains three invariant acidic residues that coordinate magnesium ions involved in DNA cleavage and DNA religation. The structure of the Toprim fold and DNA-binding core of yeast topoisomerase II was first solved by Berger and Wang, and the first gyrase DNA-binding core was solved by Morais Cabral et al. The structure solved by Berger revealed important insights into the function of the enzyme. The DNA-binding core consists of the WHD, which leads to a tower domain. A coiled-coil region leads to a C-terminal domain that forms the main dimer interface for this crystal state (often termed the C-gate). While the original topoisomerase II structure shows a situation where the WHDs are separated by a large distance, the structure of gyrase shows a closed conformation, where the WHD close.

The topoisomerase II core was later solved in new conformations, including one by Fass et al. and one by Dong et al. The Fass structure shows that the Toprim domain is flexible and that this flexibility can allow the Toprim domain to coordinate with the WHD to form a competent cleavage complex. This was eventually substantiated by the Dong et al. structure that was solved in the presence of DNA. This last structure showed that the Toprim domain and the WHD formed a cleavage complex very similar to that of the type IA topoisomerases and indicated how DNA-binding and cleavage could be uncoupled, and the structure showed that DNA was bent by ~150 degrees through an invariant isoleucine (in topoisomerase II it is I833 and in gyrase it is I172). This mechanism of bending resembles closely that of integration host factor (IHF) and HU, two architectural proteins in bacteria. In addition, while the previous structures of the DNA-binding core had the C-gate closed, this structure captured the gate open, a key step in the two-gate mechanism (see below).

More recently, several structures of the DNA-bound structure have been solved in an attempt to understand both the chemical mechanism for DNA cleavage and the structural basis for inhibition of topoisomerase by antibacterial poisons. The first complete architecture of the E. coli DNA gyrase has been solved by cryo-electron microscopy at near atomic resolution. The nucleoprotein complex was captured with a long DNA duplex and gepotidacin, a novel bacterial topoisomerase inhibitor.

The C-terminal region of the prokaryotic topoisomerases has been solved for multiple species. The first structure of a C-terminal domain of gyrase was solved by Corbett et al. and the C-terminal domain of topoisomerase IV was solved by Corbett et al. The structures formed a novel beta barrel, which bends DNA by wrapping the nucleic acid around itself. The bending of DNA by gyrase has been proposed as a key mechanism in the ability of gyrase to introduce negative supercoils into the DNA. This is consistent with footprinting data that shows that gyrase has a 140-base-pair footprint. Both gyrase and topoisomerase IV CTDs bend DNA, but only gyrase introduces negative supercoils.

Unlike the function of the C-terminal domain of prokaryotic topoisomerases, the function of the C-terminal region of eukaryotic topoisomerase II is still not clear. Studies have suggested that this region is regulated by phosphorylation and this modulates topoisomerase activity, however more research needs to be done to investigate this.

=== Type IIB ===
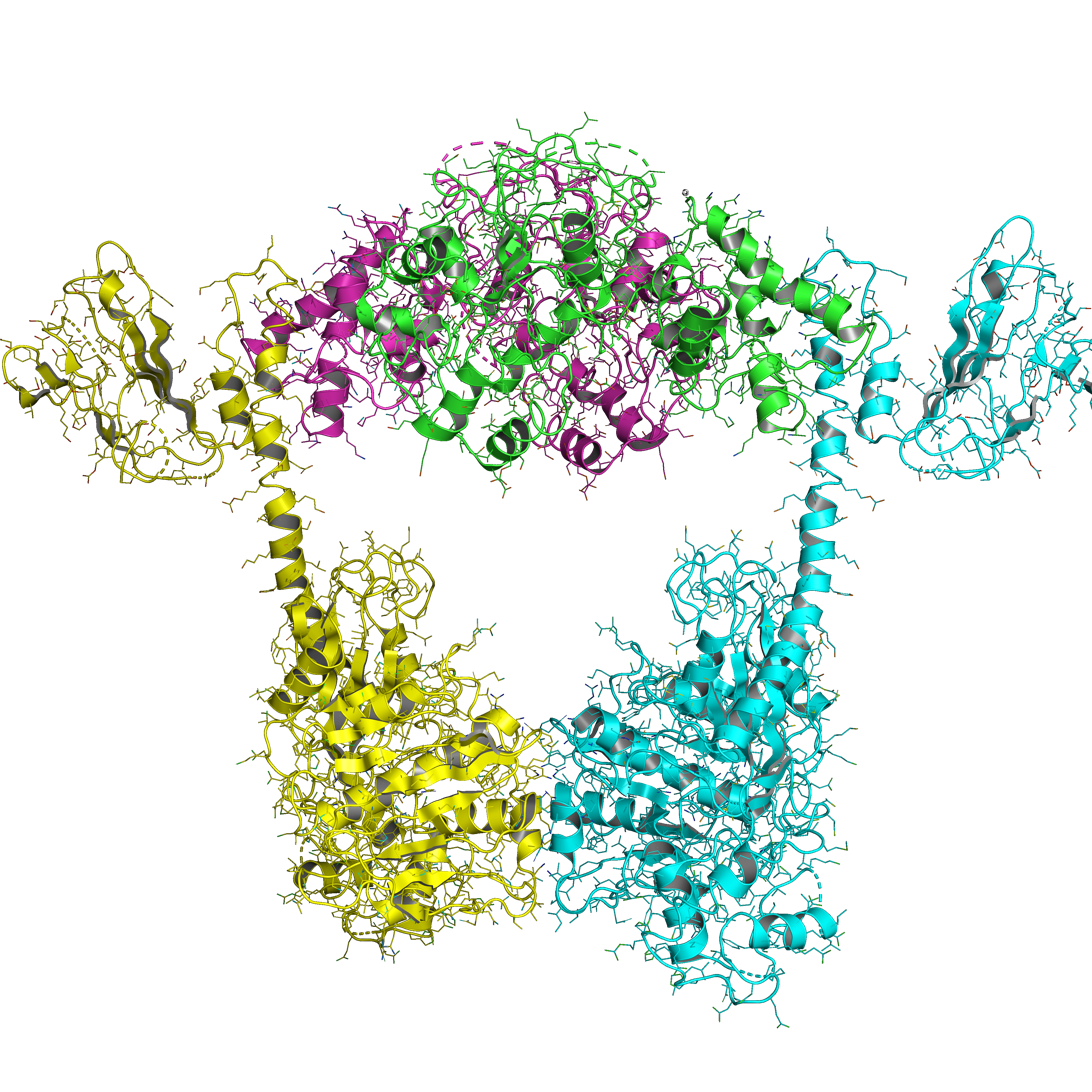
Structure of topo VI (PDB: 2Q2E) in an orientation similar to the yeast example. Chains are colored differently. The Toprim domain lies on the top, and the ATPase domain lies on the bottom; each forms a DNA gate.

The organization of type IIB topoisomerases are similar to that of type IIAs, except that all type IIBs have two genes and form heterotetramers. One gene, termed topo VI-B (since it resembles gyrB), contains the ATPase domain, a transducer domain (Pfam PF09239), and a C-terminal Ig-fold-like H2TH domain (Pfam PF18000). The second gene, termed topo VI-A (Pfam PF04406), contains the WHD and the Toprim domain.

The ATPase domain of topo VI B was solved in multiple nucleotide states. It closely resembles that of the GHKL domain of topo II and MutL and shows that the nucleotide state (ADP versus ATP) effects the orientation of the transducer domain ( and 1MX0).

The structure of topo VI-A was solved by Bergerat et al. showing that the HTH and Toprim fold had a novel conformation compared with that of topo IIA.

A recent structure of the topo VI A/B complex was solved, showing an open and closed conformation, two states that are predicted in the two-gate mechanism (see below). These structures, of which one is an X-ray crystal structure and the other is a Small-Angle X-ray Scattering (SAXS) reconstruction, show that the ATPase domain can be either open or closed.

== Mechanism of action ==
=== Strand passage ===
Type IIA topoisomerase operates through a "two-gate" mechanism (though this is a historical notation), a mechanism supported by biochemistry as well as by structural work.

A strand of DNA, called the gate, or G-segment, is bound by a central DNA-binding gate (DNA-gate). A second strand of DNA, called the transport, or T-segment, is captured by the dimerization of the N-terminal ATPase domain (the ATPase-gate) when two molecules of ATP bind. Hydrolysis of ATP and release of an inorganic phosphate leads to the cleavage of the G-segment, as the catalytic tyrosines form a covalent phosphotyrosine bond with the 5' end of the DNA. This creates a four-base overhang and a double-stranded break in the G-segment. As the DNA-binding gate separates, the T-segment is transferred through the G-segment. The G-segment is sealed, leading to the C-terminal gate (or C-gate) to open, allowing for the release of the T-segment. Release of product ADP leads to a reset of the system, and allows a second T-segment to be captured.

Type IIB topoisomerases operate through a similar fashion, except that the protein forms a two-base overhang in the G-segment and the C-terminal gate is completely missing.

=== DNA cleavage ===
In the strand passage mechanism, the cleavage of DNA is key to allow the T-segment to transfer through the G-segment. The mechanism of DNA cleavage by type IIA topoisomerases has recently been the focus of many biochemical and structural biology studies.

== Catenation ==
Catenation is the process by which two circular DNA strands are linked together like chain links. This occurs after DNA replication, where two single strands are catenated and can still replicate but cannot separate into the two daughter cells. As type II topoisomerases break a double strand, they can fix this state (type I topoisomerases could do this only if there were already a single-strand nick), and the correct chromosome number can remain in daughter cells. Linear DNA in eukaryotes is so long they can be thought of as being without ends; type II topoisomerases are needed for the same reason.

== Inhibition ==
Small molecules that target type II topoisomerase are divided into two classes: inhibitors and poisons. Due to their frequent presence in proliferating eukaryotic cells, inhibitors of type II topoisomerases have been extensively studied and used as anti-cancer medications.

- Inhibitors of type II topoisomerase include HU-331, ICRF-187, ICRF-193, and mitindomide. These molecules work by inhibiting the ATPase activity by acting as noncompetitive inhibitors of ATP. This has been shown through structural studies and biochemical studies performed by the Lindsley group.
- Poisons of type II topoisomerases include doxorubicin, etoposide, novobiocin, quinolones (including ciprofloxacin), and teniposide. These small molecules target the DNA-protein complex. Some of these molecules lead to increased cleavage, whereas others, such as etoposide, inhibit religation.

The experimental antitumor drug m-AMSA (4'-(9'-acridinylamino)methanesulfon-m-anisidide) also inhibits type 2 topoisomerase.

Topoisomerase poisons have been extensively used as both anticancer and antibacterial therapies. While antibacterial compounds such as ciprofloxacin target bacterial gyrase, they fail to inhibit eukaryotic type IIA topoisomerases. In addition, drug-resistant bacteria often have a point mutation in gyrase (Serine79Alanine in E. coli) that renders quinolones ineffective. Recent structural studies have led to the discovery of a compound that no longer relies on this residue and, therefore, has efficacy against drug-resistant bacteria.

== Bacteriophage T4 gyrase ==
The bacteriophage (phage) T4 gyrase (type II topoisomerase) is a multisubunit protein consisting of the products of genes 39, 52 and probably 60. It catalyses the relaxation of negatively or positively superhelical DNA and is employed in phage DNA replication during infection of the E. coli bacterial host. The phage gene 52 protein shares homology with the E. coli gyrase gyrA subunit and the phage gene 39 protein shares homology with the gyr B subunit. Since the host E. coli DNA gyrase can partially compensate for the loss of the phage T4 gene products, mutants defective in either genes 39, 52 or 60 do not completely abolish phage DNA replication, but rather delay its initiation. The rate of DNA elongation is not slower than wild-type in such mutant infections. Mutants defective in genes 39, 52 or 60 show increased genetic recombination as well as increased base-substitution and deletion mutation suggesting that the host compensated DNA synthesis is less accurate than that directed by wild-type phage. A mutant defective in gene 39 shows increased sensitivity to inactivation by ultraviolet irradiation during the stage of phage infection after initiation of DNA replication when multiple copies of the phage chromosome are present. Mutants defective in genes 39, 52 and 60 have reduced ability to carry out multiplicity reactivation, a form of recombinational repair that can deal with different types of DNA damage. The gyrase specified by the genome of uninfected E. coli also appears to participate in recombinational repair by providing an initiation point for the reciprocal strand exchange driven by the RecA protein.
