= Histidinol-phosphate transaminase =

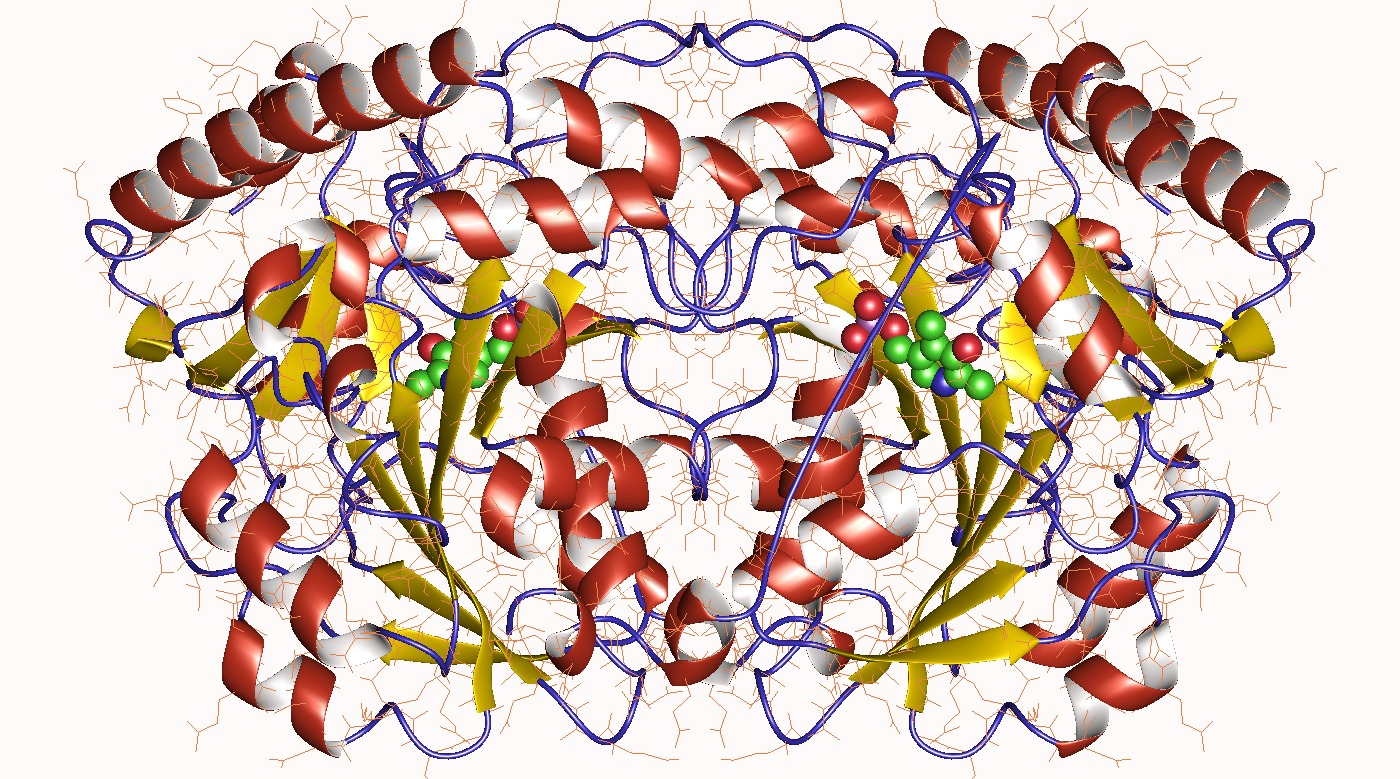
- Histidinol-phosphate transaminase homodimer, E.Coli

Identifiers
- EC no.: 2.6.1.9
- CAS no.: 9032-98-8

Databases
- IntEnz: IntEnz view
- BRENDA: BRENDA entry
- ExPASy: NiceZyme view
- KEGG: KEGG entry
- MetaCyc: metabolic pathway
- PRIAM: profile
- PDB structures: RCSB PDB PDBe PDBsum
- Gene Ontology: AmiGO / QuickGO
Search
- PMC: articles
- PubMed: articles
- NCBI: proteins

Histidinol-phosphate transaminase (EC 2.6.1.9) is an enzyme that catalyzes the reversible chemical reaction

L-histidinol phosphate
+
α-ketoglutaric acid
3-(imidazol-4-yl)-2-oxopropyl phosphate
+
L-glutamic acid

The enzyme first characterised from Neurospora crassa converts 3-(imidazol-4-yl)-2-oxopropyl phosphate to L-histidinol phosphate (a precursor to the amino acid histidine) using L-glutamic acid as the source of the amino group that is transferred. It uses pyridoxal phosphate as a cofactor and has also been found in Salmonella typhimurium.

This enzyme is a transferase, specifically a transaminase, which transfer nitrogenous groups. The systematic name of this enzyme class is L-histidinol-phosphate:2-oxoglutarate aminotransferase. Other names in common use include imidazolylacetolphosphate transaminase, glutamic-imidazoleacetol phosphate transaminase, histidinol phosphate aminotransferase, imidazoleacetol phosphate transaminase, L-histidinol phosphate aminotransferase, histidine:imidazoleacetol phosphate transaminase, IAP transaminase, and imidazolylacetolphosphate aminotransferase. It participates in five metabolic pathways: histidine metabolism, tyrosine metabolism, phenylalanine metabolism, phenylalanine, tyrosine and tryptophan biosynthesis, and novobiocin biosynthesis.

== Structural studies ==
As of late 2007, 11 structures have been solved for this class of enzymes, with PDB accession codes 1FG3, 1FG7, 1GEW, 1GEX, 1GEY, 1H1C, 1IJI, 1UU0, 1UU1, 1UU2, and 2F8J.
