= ICRF 193 =

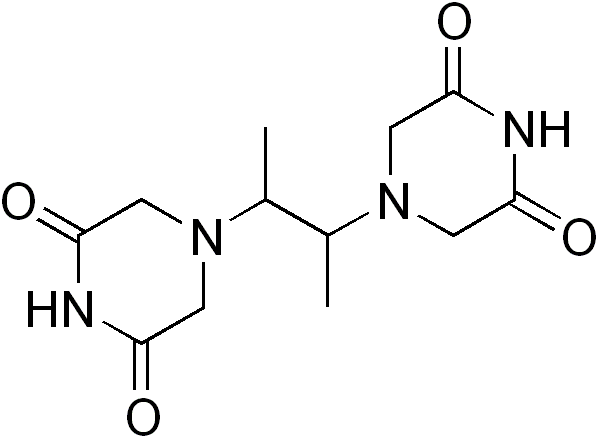

Names
- IUPAC name 4-[2-(3,5-Dioxo-1-piperazinyl)-1-methylpropyl]piperazine-2,6-dione

Identifiers
CAS Number	21416-68-2
3D model (JSmol)	Interactive image
ChEMBL	ChEMBL275665
ChemSpider	103034
MeSH	ICRF+193
PubChem CID	115150
CompTox Dashboard (EPA)	DTXSID201259810 DTXSID10943979, DTXSID201259810
- InChI: InChI=1S/C12H18N4O4/c1-7(15-3-9(17)13-10(18)4-15)8(2)16-5-11(19)14-12(20)6-16/h7-8H,3-6H2,1-2H3,(H,13,17,18)(H,14,19,20) Key: OBYGAPWKTPDTAS-UHFFFAOYSA-N; InChI=1/C12H18N4O4/c1-7(15-3-9(17)13-10(18)4-15)8(2)16-5-11(19)14-12(20)6-16/h7-8H,3-6H2,1-2H3,(H,13,17,18)(H,14,19,20) Key: OBYGAPWKTPDTAS-UHFFFAOYAB
- SMILES: O=C2NC(=O)CN(C(C(N1CC(=O)NC(=O)C1)C)C)C2

Properties
Chemical formula	C_{12}H_{18}N_{4}O_{4}
Molar mass	282.30 g/mol
- Except where otherwise noted, data are given for materials in their standard state (at 25 °C [77 °F], 100 kPa). verify (what is ?) Infobox references

ICRF 193 is a topoisomerase inhibitor.
