= GyrA RNA motif =

gyrA RNA motif
- Consensus secondary structure of gyrA RNAs

Identifiers
- Symbol: gyrA RNA
- Rfam: RF01740

Other data
- RNA type: Cis-regulatory element
- Domain(s): Pseudomonadales
- PDB structures: PDBe

The gyrA RNA motif is a conserved RNA structure identified by bioinformatics. The RNAs are present in multiple species of bacteria within the order Pseudomonadales. This order contains the genus Pseudomonas, which includes the opportunistic human pathogen Pseudomonas aeruginosa and Pseudomonas syringae, a plant pathogen.

gyrA RNAs are always found in the presumed 5' untranslated regions of gyrA genes, which encodes a protein forming a subunit of a DNA gyrase. Resistance to the antibiotic ciprofloxacin in Pseudomonas is often achieved via mutations in the gyrA gene. Because of its positioning, the gyrA RNA motif was hypothesized to be a cis-regulatory element acting up the downstream gyrA genes. However, gyrA was previously regarded as a gene whose level of expression is consistent in a wide variety of growth conditions.
