= Clorobiocin =

Chemical compound

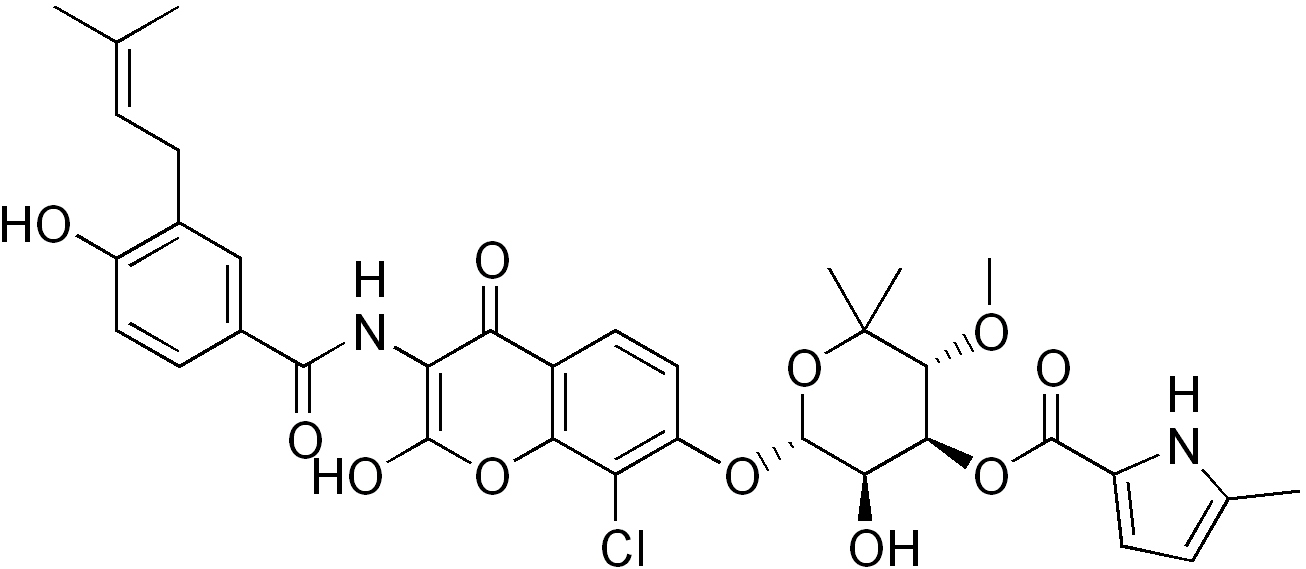

Clinical data
- Other names: Chlorobiocin
- ATC code: none

Identifiers
- IUPAC name: (3S,4R,5R,6S)-6-[(8-chloro-4-hydroxy-3-{[4-hydroxy-3-(3-methylbut-2-en-1-yl)benzene]amido}-2-oxo-2H-chromen-7-yl)oxy]-5-hydroxy-3-methoxy-2,2-dimethyloxan-4-yl 5-methylpyrrole-2-carboxylate
- CAS Number: 39868-96-7
- PubChem CID: 73622
- ChemSpider: 66286
- ChEMBL: ChEMBL303984

Chemical and physical data
- Formula: C_{35}H_{37}ClN_{2}O_{11}
- Molar mass: 697.13 g·mol^{−1}
- 3D model (JSmol): Interactive image
- SMILES: CC1=CC=C(N1)C(=O)O[C@H]2[C@H]([C@@H](OC([C@@H]2OC)(C)C)OC3=C(C4=C(C=C3)C(=O)C(=C(O4)O)NC(=O)C5=CC(=C(C=C5)O)CC=C(C)C)Cl)O
- InChI: InChI=1S/C35H37ClN2O11/c1-16(2)7-9-18-15-19(10-13-22(18)39)31(42)38-25-26(40)20-11-14-23(24(36)28(20)47-33(25)44)46-34-27(41)29(30(45-6)35(4,5)49-34)48-32(43)21-12-8-17(3)37-21/h7-8,10-15,27,29-30,34,37,39,41,44H,9H2,1-6H3,(H,38,42)/t27-,29+,30-,34-/m1/s1; Key:NOLDNICYUPLDOY-LFLQOBSNSA-N

$\ce{C35H37ClN2O11}$Clorobiocin is an aminocoumarin antibacterial that inhibits the enzyme DNA gyrase.

Clorobiocin is a naturally occurring aminocoumarin antibiotic produced by the bacterium Streptomyces roseochromogenes.
