= Albicidin =

Names
- IUPAC name 4-[[4-[[4-[[(2S)-3-cyano-2-[[4-[[(E)-3-(4-hydroxyphenyl)-2-methylprop-2-enoyl]amino]benzoyl]amino]propanoyl]amino]benzoyl]amino]-2-hydroxy-3-methoxybenzoyl]amino]-2-hydroxy-3-methoxybenzoic acid

Identifiers
CAS Number	96955-97-4
3D model (JSmol)	Interactive image
ChemSpider	32821621
PubChem CID	78322514
- InChI: InChI=1S/C44H38N6O12/c1-23(22-24-4-14-29(51)15-5-24)39(54)46-27-10-6-26(7-11-27)41(56)50-34(20-21-45)43(58)47-28-12-8-25(9-13-28)40(55)48-32-18-16-30(35(52)37(32)61-2)42(57)49-33-19-17-31(44(59)60)36(53)38(33)62-3/h4-19,22,34,51-53H,20H2,1-3H3,(H,46,54)(H,47,58)(H,48,55)(H,49,57)(H,50,56)(H,59,60)/b23-22+/t34-/m0/s1 Key: NZSWNNDHPOTJNH-VEJILBAHSA-N
- SMILES: C/C(=C\C1=CC=C(C=C1)O)/C(=O)NC2=CC=C(C=C2)C(=O)N[C@@H](CC#N)C(=O)NC3=CC=C(C=C3)C(=O)NC4=C(C(=C(C=C4)C(=O)NC5=C(C(=C(C=C5)C(=O)O)O)OC)O)OC

Properties
Chemical formula	C_{44}H_{38}N_{6}O_{12}
Molar mass	842.818 g·mol^{−1}
- Except where otherwise noted, data are given for materials in their standard state (at 25 °C [77 °F], 100 kPa). Infobox references

Albicidin is an antibiotic and phytotoxic molecule produced by the bacterium Xanthomonas albilineans which infects sugarcane causing leaf scald.

As a phytotoxin, it acts by inhibiting the differentiation of chloroplasts. It accomplishes this by inhibiting DNA gyrase, and thereby preventing the replication of chloroplast DNA. As such it plays a major role in leaf scald disease.

As a DNA gyrase inhibitor, albicindin also has potential therapeutic use as an antibiotic. Its antibiotic properties were discovered in the early 1980s, when the molecule was isolated and purified from cultures of Xanthomonas albilineans. However, the precise structure of the molecule was only identified in 2015. A laboratory synthesis of albicidin has been developed, and research is currently focused on the design and evaluation of synthetic derivatives of albicidin with improved drug-like properties.
