= Xanthomonas albilineans =

Scientific classification
- Domain: Bacteria
- Kingdom: Pseudomonadati
- Phylum: Pseudomonadota
- Class: Gammaproteobacteria
- Order: Lysobacterales
- Family: Lysobacteraceae
- Genus: Xanthomonas
- Species: X. albilineans

Binomial name
- Xanthomonas albilineans (Ashby 1929) Dowson 1943

Type strain
- ATCC 33915

Species of bacterium

Xanthomonas albilineans is a species of gram-negative bacteria. It causes leaf scald in sugarcane and is the source of the phytoxin and antibiotic albicidin. These bacteria live in the xylem of sugarcane.
