= H2TH domain =

H2TH
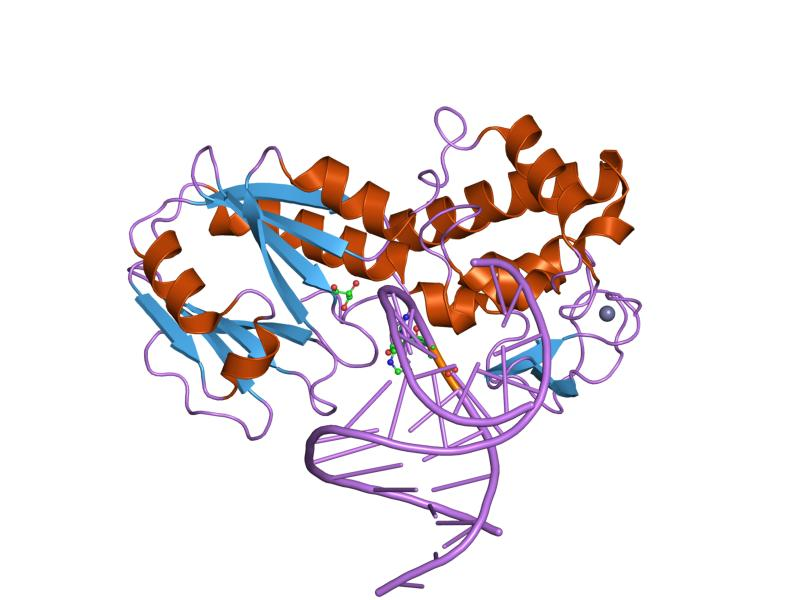
- crystal structure complex between the lactococcus lactis fpg (mutm) and a fapy-dg containing dna

Identifiers
- Symbol: H2TH
- Pfam: PF06831
- Pfam clan: CL0303
- InterPro: IPR015886
- PROSITE: PDOC00956
- SCOP2: 1k82 / SCOPe / SUPFAM
Available protein structures:
- Pfam: structures / ECOD
- PDB: RCSB PDB; PDBe; PDBj
- PDBsum: structure summary

In molecular biology, the H2TH domain (helix-2turn-helix domain) is a DNA-binding domain found in DNA glycosylase/AP lyase enzymes, which are involved in base excision repair of DNA damaged by oxidation or by mutagenic agents. Most damage to bases in DNA is repaired by the base excision repair pathway. These enzymes are primarily from bacteria, and have both DNA glycosylase activity EC 3.2.2.- and AP lyase activity EC 4.2.99.18. Examples include formamidopyrimidine-DNA glycosylases (Fpg; MutM) and endonuclease VIII (Nei).

Formamidopyrimidine-DNA glycosylases (Fpg, MutM) is a trifunctional DNA base excision repair enzyme that removes a wide range of oxidation-damaged bases (N-glycosylase activity; EC 3.2.2.23) and cleaves both the 3'- and 5'-phosphodiester bonds of the resulting apurinic/apyrimidinic site (AP lyase activity;EC 4.2.99.18). Fpg has a preference for oxidised purines, excising oxidised purine bases such as 7,8-dihydro-8-oxoguanine (8-oxoG). Its AP (apurinic/apyrimidinic) lyase activity introduces nicks in the DNA strand, cleaving the DNA backbone by beta-delta elimination to generate a single-strand break at the site of the removed base with both 3'- and 5'-phosphates. Fpg is a monomer composed of 2 domains connected by a flexible hinge. The two DNA-binding motifs (a zinc finger and the H2TH (helix-two-turns-helix) motifs) suggest that the oxidised base is flipped out from double-stranded DNA in the binding mode and excised by a catalytic mechanism similar to that of bifunctional base excision repair enzymes. Fpg binds one ion of zinc at the C terminus, which contains four conserved and essential cysteines.

Endonuclease VIII (Nei) has the same enzyme activities as Fpg above (EC 3.2.2.-,EC 4.2.99.18), but with a preference for oxidized pyrimidines, such as thymine glycol, 5,6-dihydrouracil and 5,6-dihydrothymine. These proteins contain three structural domains: an N-terminal catalytic core domain, a central helix-two turn-helix (H2TH) module and a C-terminal zinc finger (see PDB:1K82). The N-terminal catalytic domain and the C-terminal zinc finger straddle the DNA with the long axis of the protein oriented roughly orthogonal to the helical axis of the DNA. Residues that contact DNA are located in the catalytic domain and in a beta-hairpin loop formed by the zinc finger.
