= Novobiocin =

Chemical compound

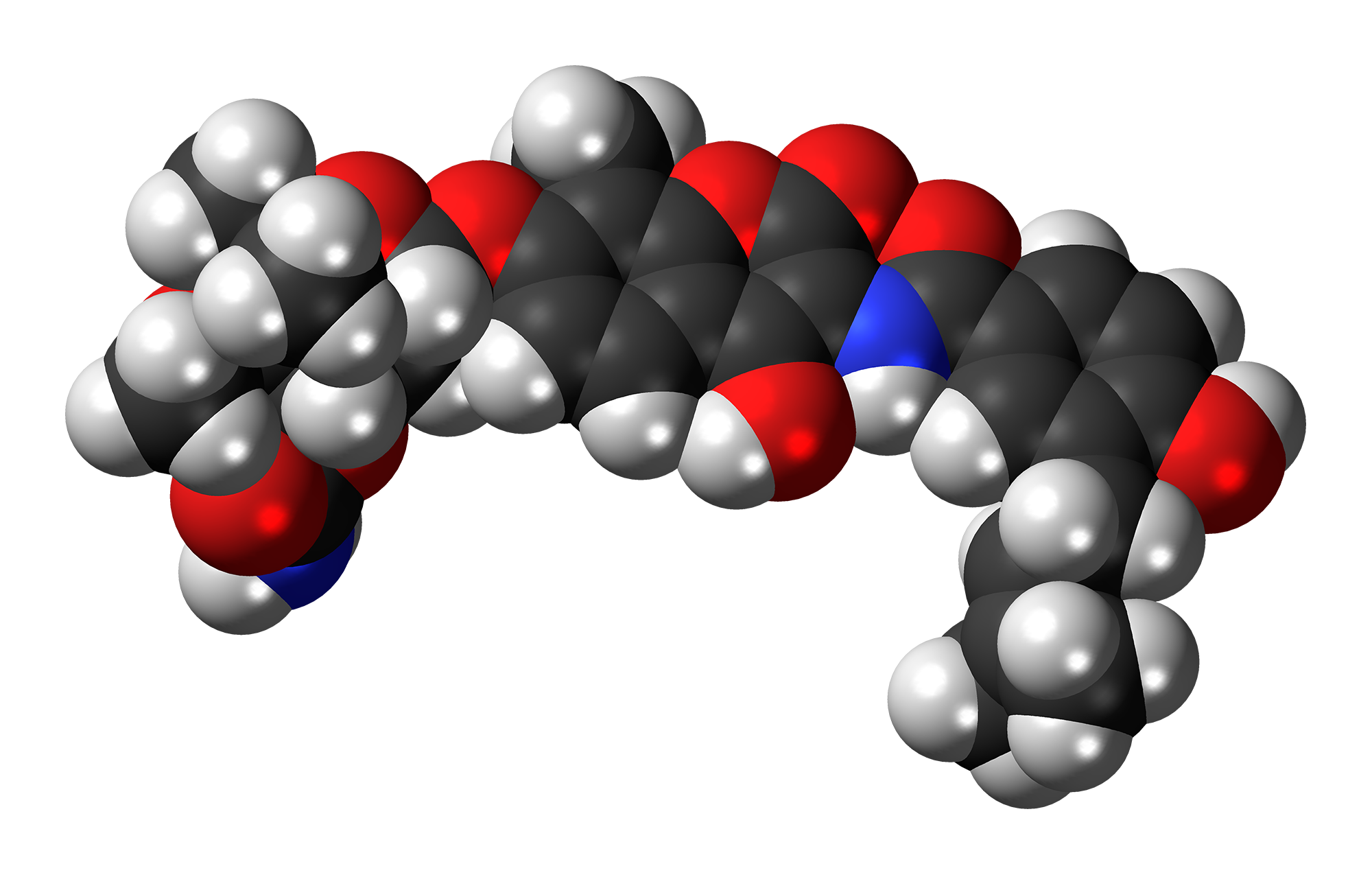

Clinical data
- AHFS/Drugs.com: International Drug Names
- Routes of administration: intravenous
- ATCvet code: QJ01XX95 (WHO)

Pharmacokinetic data
- Bioavailability: negligible oral bioavailability
- Metabolism: excreted unchanged
- Elimination half-life: 6 hours
- Excretion: renal

Identifiers
- IUPAC name: 4-Hydroxy-3-[4-hydroxy-3-(3-methylbut-2-enyl)benzamido]-8-methylcoumarin-7-yl 3-O-carbamoyl-5,5-di-C-methyl-α-L-lyxofuranoside
- CAS Number: 303-81-1
- PubChem CID: 9346
- DrugBank: DB01051
- ChemSpider: 10226117
- UNII: 17EC19951N
- KEGG: C05080
- ChEMBL: ChEMBL36506
- CompTox Dashboard (EPA): DTXSID3041083
- ECHA InfoCard: 100.005.589

Chemical and physical data
- Formula: C_{31}H_{36}N_{2}O_{11}
- Molar mass: 612.632 g·mol^{−1}
- 3D model (JSmol): Interactive image
- Melting point: 152 to 156 °C (306 to 313 °F) (dec.)
- SMILES: CC(C)=CCc1c(O)ccc(c1)C(=O)NC=2C(=O)Oc3c(C2O)ccc(c3C)O[C@@H]4OC(C)(C)[C@H](OC)[C@H]([C@H]4O)OC(=O)N
- InChI: InChI=1S/C31H36N2O11/c1-14(2)7-8-16-13-17(9-11-19(16)34)27(37)33-21-22(35)18-10-12-20(15(3)24(18)42-28(21)38)41-29-23(36)25(43-30(32)39)26(40-6)31(4,5)44-29/h7,9-13,23,25-26,29,34-36H,8H2,1-6H3,(H2,32,39)(H,33,37)/t23-,25+,26-,29-/m1/s1; Key:YJQPYGGHQPGBLI-KGSXXDOSSA-N

Novobiocin, also known as albamycin, is an aminocoumarin antibiotic that is produced by the actinomycete Streptomyces niveus, which is a heterotypic synonym for S. spheroides a member of the class Actinomycetia. Other aminocoumarin antibiotics include clorobiocin and coumermycin A1. Novobiocin was first reported in the mid-1950s (then called streptonivicin).

== Clinical use ==
It is active against Staphylococcus epidermidis and may be used to differentiate S. epidermidis from coagulase-negative Staphylococcus saprophyticus, which is resistant to novobiocin, in culture.

Novobiocin was licensed for clinical use under the tradename Albamycin (Upjohn) in the 1960s. Its efficacy has been demonstrated in preclinical and clinical trials. The oral form of the drug has since been withdrawn from the market due to lack of efficacy. A combination product of novobiocin and tetracycline, sold by Upjohn under brand names such as Panalba and Albamycin-T, was in particular the subject of intense FDA scrutiny before it was finally taken off the market. Novobiocin is an effective antistaphylococcal agent used in the treatment of MRSA.

== Mechanism of action ==
The molecular basis of action of novobiocin, and other related drugs clorobiocin and coumermycin A1, has been examined. Aminocoumarins are very potent inhibitors of bacterial DNA gyrase and work by targeting the GyrB subunit of the enzyme involved in energy transduction. Novobiocin as well as the other aminocoumarin antibiotics act as competitive inhibitors of the ATPase reaction catalysed by GyrB. The potency of novobiocin is considerably higher than that of the fluoroquinolones that also target DNA gyrase, but at a different site on the enzyme. The GyrA subunit is involved in the DNA nicking and ligation activity.

Novobiocin has been shown to weakly inhibit the C-terminus of the eukaryotic Hsp90 protein (high micromolar IC50). Modification of the novobiocin scaffold has led to more selective Hsp90 inhibitors. Novobiocin has also been shown to bind and activate the Gram-negative lipopolysaccharide transporter LptBFGC.

The ATP binding pocket of polymerase theta is blocked by novobiocin resulting in a loss of ATPase activity. This results in the loss of microhomology-mediated end joining as a pathway for homologous recombination deficient cells to circumvent DNA damaging agents. The action of novobiocin is syngeristic with PARP inhibitors for reducing tumor size in a mouse model.

== Structure ==
Novobiocin is an aminocoumarin. Novobiocin may be divided up into three entities; a benzoic acid derivative, a coumarin residue, and the sugar novobiose. X-ray crystallographic studies have found that the drug-receptor complex of Novobiocin and DNA Gyrase shows that ATP and Novobiocin have overlapping binding sites on the gyrase molecule. The overlap of the coumarin and ATP-binding sites is consistent with aminocoumarins being competitive inhibitors of the ATPase activity.

=== Structure–activity relationship ===
In structure activity relationship experiments it was found that removal of the carbamoyl group located on the novobiose sugar lead to a dramatic decrease in inhibitory activity of novobiocin.

== Biosynthesis ==
This aminocoumarin antibiotic consists of three major substituents. The 3-dimethylallyl-4-hydroxybenzoic acid moiety, known as ring A, is derived from prephenate and dimethylallyl pyrophosphate. The aminocoumarin moiety, known as ring B, is derived from L-tyrosine. The final component of novobiocin is the sugar derivative L-noviose, known as ring C, which is derived from glucose-1-phosphate. The biosynthetic gene cluster for novobiocin was identified by Heide and coworkers in 1999 (published 2000) from Streptomyces spheroides NCIB 11891. They identified 23 putative open reading frames (ORFs) and more than 11 other ORFs that may play a role in novobiocin biosynthesis.

The biosynthesis of ring A (see Fig. 1) begins with prephenate which is a derived from the shikimic acid biosynthetic pathway. The enzyme NovF catalyzes the decarboxylation of prephenate while simultaneously reducing nicotinamide adenine dinucleotide phosphate (NADP^{+}) to produce NADPH. Following this NovQ catalyzes the electrophilic substitution of the phenyl ring with dimethylallyl pyrophosphate (DMAPP) otherwise known as prenylation. DMAPP can come from either the mevalonic acid pathway or the deoxyxylulose biosynthetic pathway. Next the 3-dimethylallyl-4-hydroxybenzoate molecule is subjected to two oxidative decarboxylations by NovR and molecular oxygen. NovR is a non-heme iron oxygenase with a unique bifunctional catalysis. In the first stage both oxygens are incorporated from the molecular oxygen while in the second step only one is incorporated as determined by isotope labeling studies. This completes the formation of ring A.

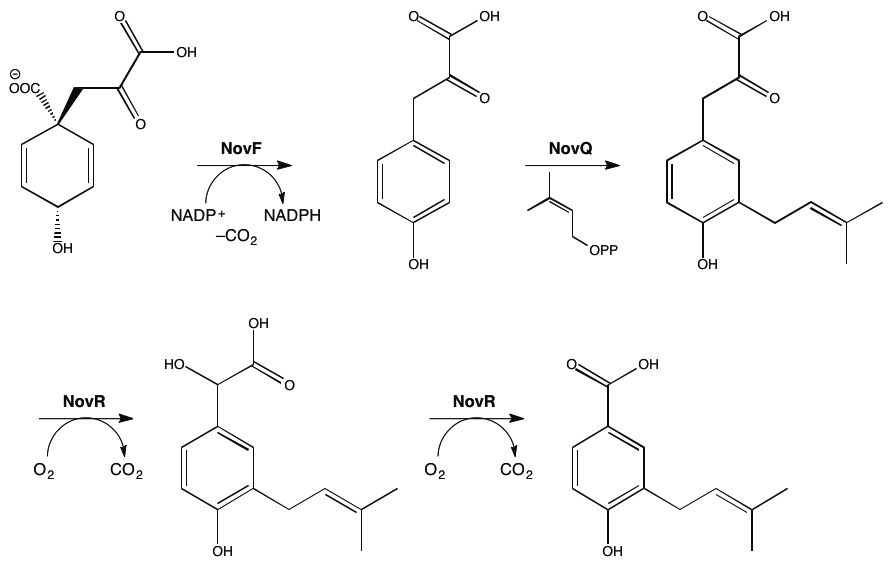
Figure 1. Biosynthetic scheme of benzamide portion of novobiocin (4-hydroxy-3-(3-methylbut-2-en-1-yl)benzoic acid)

The biosynthesis of ring B (see Fig. 2) begins with the natural amino acid L-tyrosine. This is then adenylated and thioesterified onto the peptidyl carrier protein (PCP) of NovH by ATP and NovH itself. NovI then further modifies this PCP bound molecule by oxidizing the β-position using NADPH and molecular oxygen. NovJ and NovK form a heterodimer of J2K2 which is the active form of this benzylic oxygenase. This process uses NADP^{+} as a hydride acceptor in the oxidation of the β-alcohol. This ketone will prefer to exist in its enol tautomer in solution. Next a still unidentified protein catalyzes the selective oxidation of the benzene (as shown in Fig. 2). Upon oxidation this intermediate will spontaneously lactonize to form the aromatic ring B and lose NovH in the process.

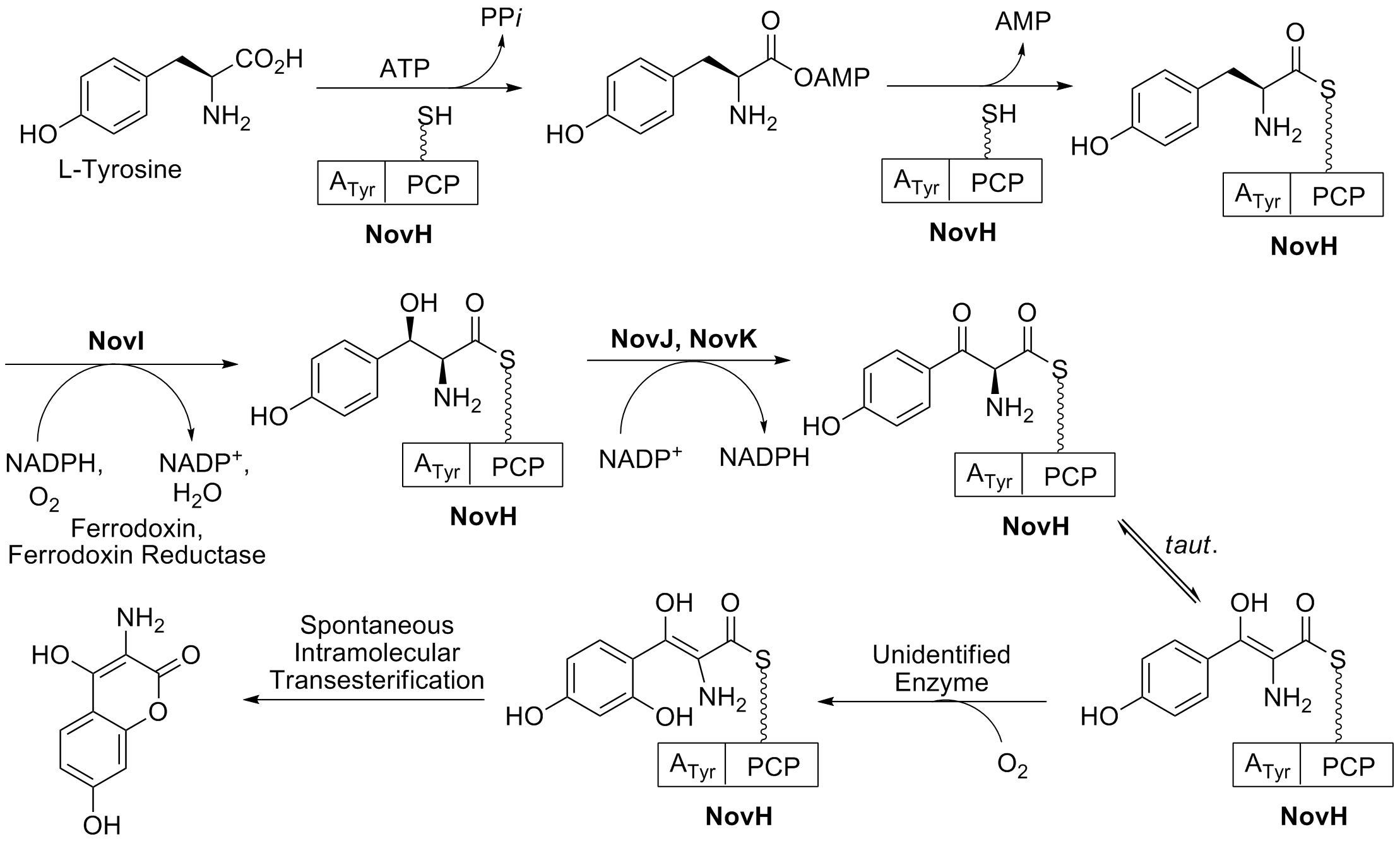
Figure 2. Biosynthesis of 3-amino-4,7-dihydroxy-2H-chromen-2-one component of novobiocin (ring B)

The biosynthesis of L-noviose (ring C) is shown in Fig. 3. This process starts from glucose-1-phosphate where NovV takes dTTP and replaces the phosphate group with a dTDP group. NovT then oxidizes the 4-hydroxy group using NAD^{+}. NovT also accomplishes a dehydroxylation of the 6 position of the sugar. NovW then epimerizes the 3 position of the sugar. The methylation of the 5 position is accomplished by NovU and S-adenosyl methionine (SAM). Finally NovS reduces the 4 position again to achieve epimerization of that position from the starting glucose-1-phosphate using NADH.

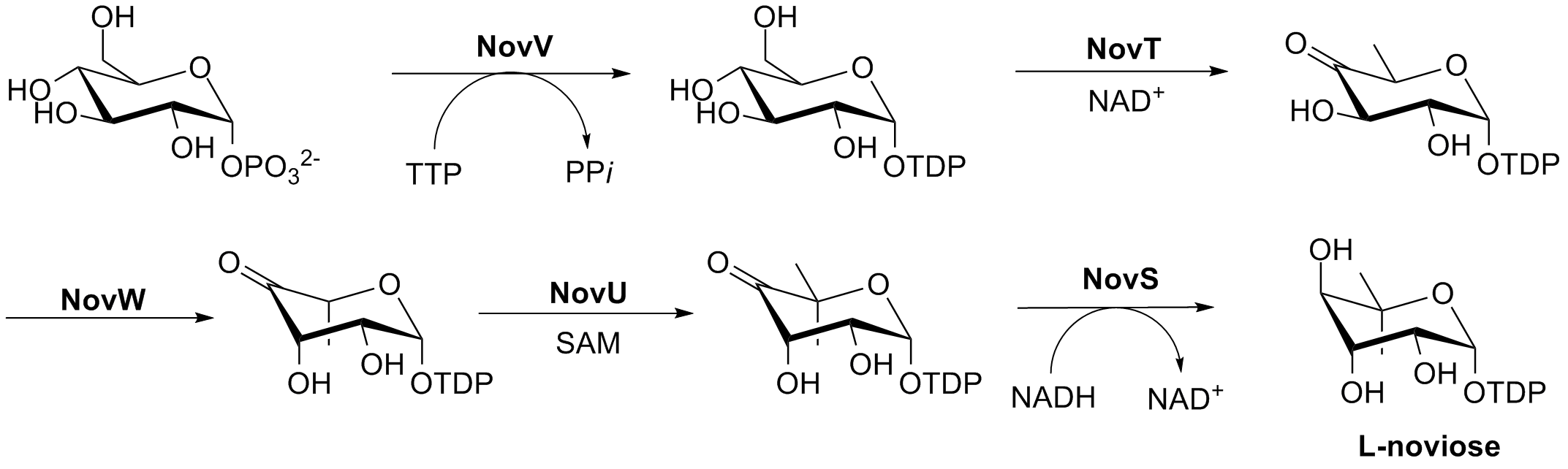
Figure 3. Biosynthesis of L-noviose component of novobiocin (ring C)

Rings A, B, and C are coupled together and modified to give the finished novobiocin molecule. Rings A and B are coupled together by the enzyme NovL using ATP to diphosphorylate the carboxylate group of ring A so that the carbonyl can be attacked by the amine group on ring B. The resulting compound is methylated by NovO and SAM prior to glycosylation. NovM adds ring C (L-noviose) to the hydroxyl group derived from tyrosine with the loss of dTDP. Another methylation is accomplished by NovP and SAM at the 4 position of the L-noviose sugar. This methylation allows NovN to carbamylate the 3 position of the sugar as shown in Fig. 4 completing the biosynthesis of novobiocin.

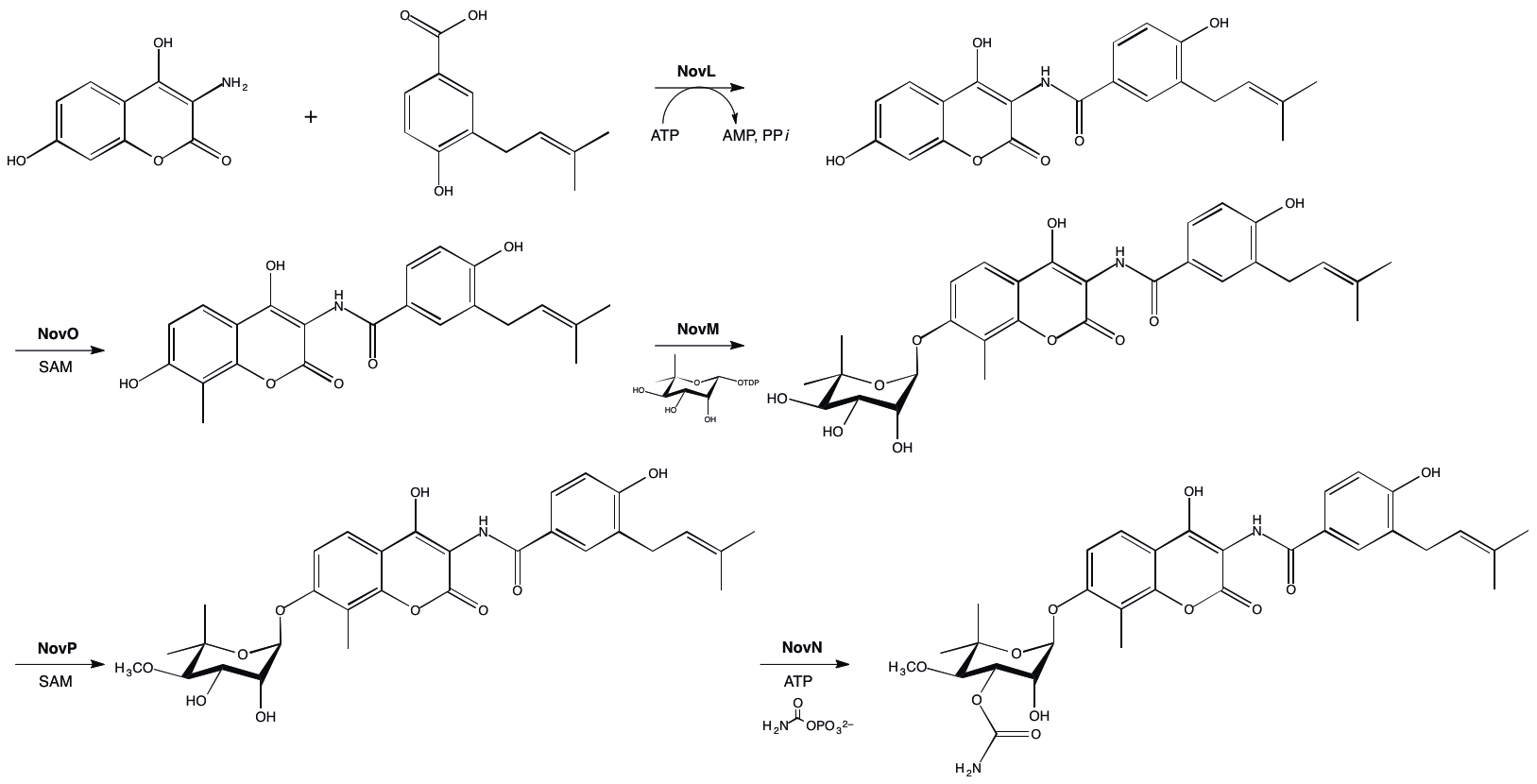
Figure 4. Completed biosynthesis of novobiocin from ring systems A, B, and C.
