= Aminocoumarin =

Class of antibiotic chemical compounds

Skeletal formula of novobiocin

Aminocoumarin is a class of antibiotics that act by an inhibition of the DNA gyrase enzyme involved in the cell division in bacteria. They are derived from Streptomyces species, whose best-known representative – Streptomyces coelicolor – was completely sequenced in 2002. The aminocoumarin antibiotics include:

- Novobiocin, Albamycin (Pharmacia And Upjohn)
- Coumermycin
- Clorobiocin

== Structure ==
The core of aminocoumarin antibiotics is made up of a 3-amino-4,7-dihydroxycumarin ring, which is linked, e.g., with a sugar in 7-Position and a benzoic acid derivative in 3-Position.

Clorobiocin is a natural antibiotic isolated from several Streptomyces strains and differs from novobiocin in that the methyl group at the 8 position in the coumarin ring of novobiocin is replaced by a chlorine atom, and the carbamoyl at the 3' position of the noviose sugar is substituted by a 5-methyl-2-pyrrolylcarbonyl group.

== Mechanism of action ==
The aminocoumarin antibiotics are known inhibitors of DNA gyrase. Antibiotics of the aminocoumarin family exert their therapeutic activity by binding tightly to the B subunit of bacterial DNA gyrase, thereby inhibiting this essential enzyme. They compete with ATP for binding to the B subunit of this enzyme and inhibit the ATP-dependent DNA supercoiling catalysed by gyrase. X-ray crystallography studies have confirmed binding at the ATP-binding site located on the gyrB subunit of DNA gyrase. Their affinity for gyrase is considerably higher than that of modern fluoroquinolones, which also target DNA gyrase but at the gyrA subunit.

== Resistance ==
Resistance to this class of antibiotics usually results from genetic mutation in the gyrB subunit. Other mechanisms include de novo synthesis of a coumarin-resistant gyrase B subunit by the novobiocin producer S. sphaeroides.

== Clinical use ==
The clinical use of this antibiotic class has been restricted due to the low water solubility, low activity against gram-negative bacteria, and toxicity in vivo of this class of antibiotics.
