= DNA gyrase =

Enzyme

Identifiers
- EC no.: 5.6.2.2

Databases
- BRENDA: enzyme data
- ExPASy: NiceZyme view
- KEGG: enzyme entry
- MetaCyc: metabolic pathway
- Rhea: reactions
- PDB structures: RCSB PDB PDBe PDBsum
Search
- PMC: articles
- PubMed: articles
- NCBI: proteins

DNA gyrase, or simply gyrase, is an enzyme within the class of topoisomerase and is a subclass of Type II topoisomerases that reduces topological strain in an ATP dependent manner while double-stranded DNA is being unwound by elongating RNA-polymerase or by helicase in front of the progressing replication fork. It is the only known enzyme to actively contribute negative supercoiling to DNA, while it also is capable of relaxing positive supercoils. It does so by looping the template to form a crossing, then cutting one of the double helices and passing the other through it before releasing the break, changing the linking number by two in each enzymatic step. This process occurs in bacteria, whose single circular DNA is cut by DNA gyrase and the two ends are then twisted around each other to form supercoils. Gyrase is also found in eukaryotic plastids: it has been found in the apicoplast of the malarial parasite Plasmodium falciparum and in chloroplasts of several plants. Bacterial DNA gyrase is the target of many antibiotics, including nalidixic acid, novobiocin, albicidin, and ciprofloxacin.

The unique ability of gyrase to introduce negative supercoils into DNA at the expense of ATP hydrolysis is what allows bacterial DNA to have free negative supercoils. The ability of gyrase to relax positive supercoils comes into play during DNA replication and prokaryotic transcription. The helical nature of the DNA causes positive supercoils to accumulate ahead of a translocating enzyme, in the case of DNA replication, a DNA polymerase. The ability of gyrase (and topoisomerase IV) to relax positive supercoils allows superhelical tension ahead of the polymerase to be released so that replication can continue.

== Gyrase structure ==
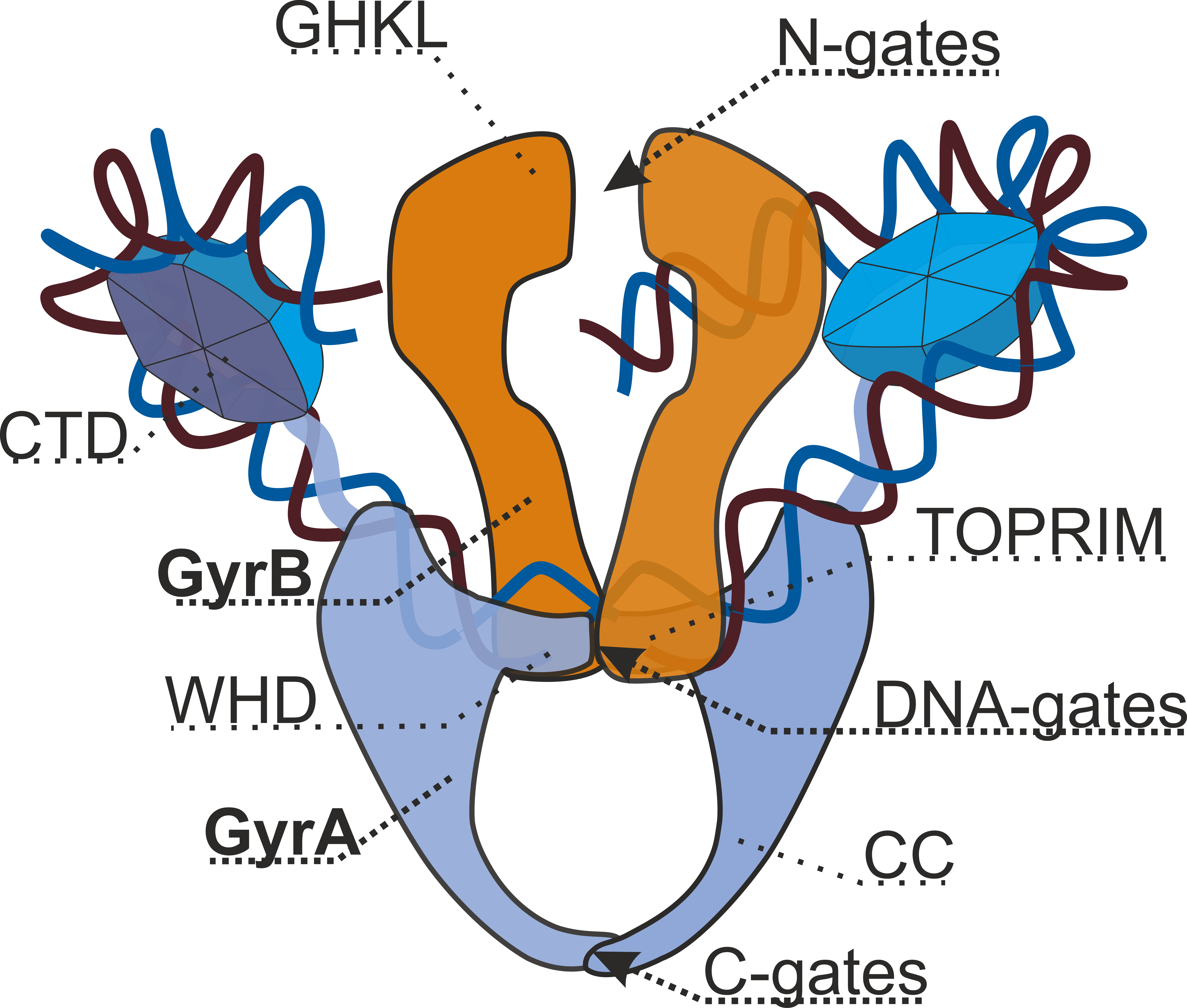
Scheme of gyrase structure

DNA gyrase is a tetrameric enzyme that consists of 2 GyrA ("A") and 2 GyrB ("B") subunits. Structurally the complex is formed by 3 pairs of "gates", sequential opening and closing of which results into the direct transfer of DNA segment and introduction of 2 negative supercoils. N-gates are formed by ATPase domains of GyrB subunits. Binding of 2 ATP molecules leads to dimerization and, therefore, closing of the gates. Hydrolysis, on the contrary, opens them. DNA cleavage and reunion is performed by a catalytic center located in DNA-gates build by all gyrase subunits. C-gates are formed by GyrA subunits.

== Mechanochemical model of gyrase activity ==
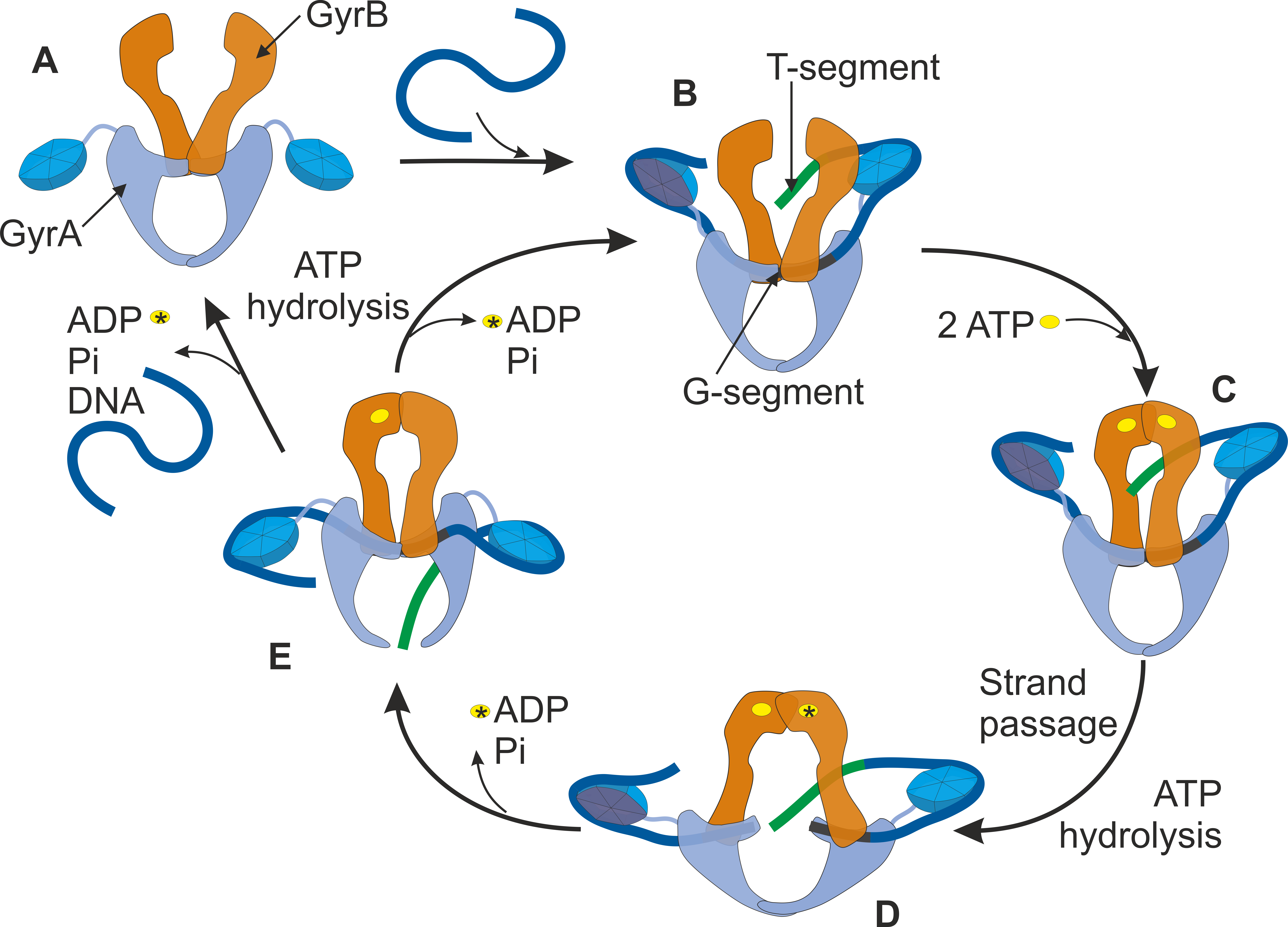
DNA gyrase catalytic cycle

A single molecule study has characterized gyrase activity as a function of DNA tension (applied force) and ATP, and proposed a mechanochemical model. Upon binding to DNA (the "Gyrase-DNA" state), there is a competition between DNA wrapping and dissociation, where increasing DNA tension increases the probability of dissociation. According to the catalytic cycle proposed, binding of 2 ATP molecules causes dimerization of ATPase domains of GyrB subunits and capturing of a T-segment of DNA (T- from transferring) in a cavity between GyrB subunits. On a next step the enzyme cleaves a G-segment of DNA (G- from gate) making a double-strand break. Then the T-segment is transferred through the break, which is accompanied by the hydrolysis of the first ATP molecule. DNA-gyrase ligates the break in a G-segment back and T-segment finally leaves the enzyme complex. Hydrolysis of the second ATP returns the system to the initial step of a cycle. As the result of a catalytic cycle two ATP molecules are hydrolyzed and two negative supercoils are introduced into the DNA template. The number of superhelical turns introduced into an initially relaxed circular DNA has been calculated to be approximately equal to the number of ATP molecules hydrolyzed by gyrase. Therefore, it can be suggested that two ATP molecules are hydrolyzed per cycle of reaction by gyrase, leading to the introduction of a linking difference of -2.

== Gyrase specificity ==
Gyrase has a pronounced specificity to DNA substrates. Strong gyrase binding sites (SGS) were found in some phages (bacteriophage Mu group) and plasmids (pSC101, pBR322). Recently, high throughput mapping of DNA gyrase sites in the Escherichia coli genome using Topo-Seq approach revealed a long (≈130 bp) and degenerate binding motif that can explain the existence of SGSs. The gyrase motif reflects wrapping of DNA around the enzyme complex and DNA flexibility. It contains two periodic regions in which GC-rich islands are alternated with AT-rich patches by a period close to the period of DNA double helix (≈10.5 bp). The two regions correspond to DNA binding by C-terminal domains of GyrA subunits and resemble eukaryotic nucleosome binding motif.

== Inhibition by antibiotics ==
Gyrase is present in prokaryotes and some eukaryotes, but the enzymes are not entirely similar in structure or sequence, and have different affinities for different molecules. This makes gyrase a good target for antibiotics. Two classes of antibiotics that inhibit gyrase are:

- The aminocoumarins (including novobiocin and Coumermycin A1), which work by competitive inhibition of energy transduction of DNA gyrase by binding to the ATPase active site on the GyrB subunit.
- The quinolones (including nalidixic acid and ciprofloxacin) are known as topoisomerase poisons. By binding to the enzyme they trap it in a transient step of the catalytic cycle, preventing the reunion of a G-segment. This results in an accumulation of double-strand breaks, stalling of replication forks and cell death. Quinolone-resistant bacteria frequently harbor mutated topoisomerases that resist quinolone binding.

The subunit A is selectively inactivated by antibiotics such as oxolinic and nalidixic acids. The subunit B is selectively inactivated by antibiotics such as coumermycin A_{1} and novobiocin. Inhibition of either subunit blocks supertwisting activity.

== Phage T4 ==
Phage T4 genes 39, 52 and 60 encode proteins that form a DNA gyrase that is employed in phage DNA replication during infection of the E. coli bacterial host. The phage gene 52 protein shares homology with the bacterial gyrase gyrA subunit and the phage gene 39 protein shares homology with the gyrB subunit. Since the host E. coli DNA gyrase can partially compensate for the loss of the phage gene products, mutants defective in either genes 39, 52 or 60 do not completely abolish phage DNA replication, but rather delay its initiation. Mutants defective in genes 39, 52 or 60 show increased genetic recombination as well as increased base-substitution and deletion mutation suggesting that the host compensated DNA synthesis is less accurate than that directed by wild-type phage. A mutant defective in gene 39 also shows increased sensitivity to inactivation by ultraviolet irradiation during the stage of phage infection after initiation of DNA replication when multiple copies of the phage chromosome are present.

== See also ==
- GyrA RNA motif
