= Coumermycin A1 =

Chemical compound

Clinical data
- Other names: Coumamycin
- ATC code: none

Identifiers
- IUPAC name: 3-methyl-1H-pyrrole-2,4-diyl)bis[carbonylimino(4-hydroxy-8-methyl-2-oxo-2H-chromene-3,7-diyl)oxy(2R,3R,4S,5R)-3-hydroxy-5-methoxy-6,6-dimethyltetrahydro-2H-pyran-2,4-diyl] bis(5-methyl-1H-pyrrole-2-carboxylate
- CAS Number: 4434-05-3
- PubChem CID: 54675768
- ChemSpider: 16736904
- UNII: PCH9QZ1IIH
- ChEBI: CHEBI:3907
- ChEMBL: ChEMBL389471
- CompTox Dashboard (EPA): DTXSID901023379
- ECHA InfoCard: 100.164.703

Chemical and physical data
- Formula: C_{55}H_{59}N_{5}O_{20}
- Molar mass: 1110.092 g·mol^{−1}
- 3D model (JSmol): Interactive image
- SMILES: CO[C@@H]1[C@H](OC(=O)c2ccc(C)[nH]2)[C@@H](O)[C@H](Oc2ccc3c(O)c(NC(=O)c4c[nH]c(C(=O)Nc5c(=O)oc6c(C)c(ccc6c5O)O[C@@H]5OC(C)(C)[C@H](OC)[C@H](OC(=O)c6ccc(C)[nH]6)[C@H]5O)c4C)c(=O)oc3c2C)OC1(C)C
- InChI: InChI=1S/C55H59N5O20/c1-21-12-16-29(57-21)48(67)77-42-38(63)52(79-54(6,7)44(42)71-10)73-31-18-14-26-36(61)34(50(69)75-40(26)24(31)4)59-46(65)28-20-56-33(23(28)3)47(66)60-35-37(62)27-15-19-32(25(5)41(27)76-51(35)70)74-53-39(64)43(45(72-11)55(8,9)80-53)78-49(68)30-17-13-22(2)58-30/h12-20,38-39,42-45,52-53,56-58,61-64H,1-11H3,(H,59,65)(H,60,66)/t38-,39-,42+,43+,44-,45-,52-,53-/m1/s1; Key:WTIJXIZOODAMJT-DHFGXMAYSA-N

Coumermycin A1 is an aminocoumarin. Its main target is the ATPase site of the DNA gyrase GyrB subunit. It was developed in the early 1960's by Bristol Myers Squibb.

== See also ==
- Chemically induced dimerization
