= List of drugs: Be-Bg =

This multi-page article lists pharmaceutical drugs alphabetically by name. Many drugs have more than one name and, therefore, the same drug may be listed more than once. Brand names and generic names are differentiated by capitalizing brand names.

See also the list of the top 100 bestselling branded drugs, ranked by sales.

Abbreviations are used in the list as follows:

- INN = International nonproprietary name
- BAN = British Approved Name
- USAN = United States Adopted Name
- Two-letter codes for countries

Lists of drugs
1–9 | A | B | C | D | E | F | G | H | I | J | K | L | M | N | O | P | Q | R | S | T | U | V | W | X | Y | Z

Ba-Bc | Be-Bg | Bi–Bo | Br | Bs–Bz

== be ==
=== beb-bek ===
- Bebulin (Baxter International)
- becampanel (INN)
- becantone (INN)
- becaplermin (INN)
- becatecarin (USAN)
- beciparcil (INN)
- beclamide (INN)
- beclanorsen (INN)
- becliconazole (INN)
- beclobrate (INN)
- beclometasone (INN)
- beclotiamine (INN)
- Beclovent
- becocalcitol (USAN)
- Becomject-100
- Beconase
- Becotin Pulvules
- bectumomab (INN)
- bedaquiline (USAN, INN)
- bederocin (USAN, INN)
- bedoradrine (INN)
- Beepen-VK
- befetupitant (USAN)
- befiperide (INN)
- befiradol (INN)
- befloxatone (INN)
- befunolol (INN)
- befuraline (INN)
- begacestat (USAN, INN)
- bekanamycin (INN)
- Bekemv

=== bel-bem ===
- Bel-Phen-Ergot S
- Bel-Tabs
- belagenpumatucel-l (USAN)
- belaperidone (INN)
- belarizine (INN)
- belatacept (USAN, INN)
- Beldin
- belfosdil (INN)
- belimumab (USAN)
- belinostat (USAN, INN)
- Belix
- Bellafoline
- Bellatal
- Bellergal-S
- beloranib (INN)
- belotecan (USAN)
- beloxamide (INN)
- beloxepin (INN)
- Belviq (Arena Pharmaceuticals)
- bemarinone (INN)
- bemegride (INN)
- bemesetron (INN)
- bemetizide (INN)
- bemitradine (INN)
- bemoradan (INN)
- Bemote
- bemotrizinol (USAN)

=== ben ===
- Ben-Allergin-50 Injection
- Ben-Aqua

==== bena-bene ====
- Bena-D
- benactyzine (INN)
- Benadryl (Johnson & Johnson)
- benafentrine (INN)
- benaprizine (INN)
- benaxibine (INN)
- benazepril (INN)
- benazeprilat (INN)
- bencianol (INN)
- bencisteine (INN)
- benclonidine (INN)
- bencyclane (INN)
- bendacalol (INN)
- bendamustine (INN)
- bendazac (INN)
- bendazol (INN)
- Bendectin
- benderizine (INN)
- Bendopa
- bendroflumethiazide (INN)
- BeneFix (Wyeth/Pfizer)
- Benemid
- benethamine penicillin (INN)
- benexate (INN)

==== benf-bens ====
- benfluorex (INN)
- benfosformin (INN)
- benfotiamine (INN)
- benfurodil hemisuccinate (INN)
- benhepazone (INN)
- Benicar HCT
- Benicar
- benidipine (INN)
- benmoxin (INN)
- Benoject
- benolizime (INN)
- Benoquin
- benorilate (INN)
- benorterone (INN)
- benoxafos (INN)
- benoxaprofen (INN)
- Benoxinate
- Benoxyl
- benpenolisin (INN)
- benperidol (INN)
- benproperine (INN)
- benralizumab (INN)
- benrixate (INN)
- bensalan (INN)
- benserazide (INN)
- bensuldazic acid (INN)
- Bensulfoid

==== bent-beny ====
- bentamapimod (INN)
- bentazepam (INN)
- bentemazole (INN)
- bentiamine (INN)
- bentipimine (INN)
- bentiromide (INN)
- Bentyl
- Bentylol
- benurestat (INN)
- Benuryl
- Benylin

==== benz ====
===== benza-benzn =====
- Benza
- Benzac
- Benzaclin
- Benzacot
- Benzagel
- benzalkonium chloride (INN)
- Benzamycin
- benzaprinoxide (INN)
- benzarone (INN)
- benzarone (INN)
- Benzashave
- benzathine benzylpenicillin (INN)
- benzatropine (INN)
- benzbromarone (INN)
- Benzedrex
- benzestrol (INN)
- benzethidine (INN)
- benzethonium chloride (INN)
- benzetimide (INN)
- benzfetamine (INN)
- benzgalantamine (INN)
- benzilonium bromide (INN)
- benzindopyrine (INN)
- benziodarone (INN)
- benzmalecene (INN)
- benznidazole (INN)

===== benzo-benzy =====
- benzobarbital (INN)
- benzocaine (INN)
- benzoclidine (INN)
- Benzocol
- benzoctamine (INN)
- Benzodent
- benzodepa (INN)
- benzododecinium chloride (INN)
- benzonatate (INN)
- benzopyrronium bromide (INN)
- Benzotic
- benzotript (INN)
- benzoxiquine (INN)
- benzoxonium chloride (INN)
- benzpiperylone (INN)
- benzpyrinium bromide (INN)
- benzquercin (INN)
- benzquinamide (INN)
- benzthiazide (INN)
- benztropine (INN)
- benzydamine (INN)
- Benzyl Benzoate
- benzylpenicillin (INN)
- benzylsulfamide (INN)

=== bep-bes ===
- Bepadin
- bepafant (INN)
- beperidium iodide (INN)
- beperminogene perplasmid (INN)
- bephenium hydroxynaphthoate (INN)
- bepiastine (INN)
- bepirovirsen (USAN, INN)
- Bepotastine (USAN, INN)
- bepridil (INN)
- Beqalzi
- Beqvez
- berahyaluronidase alfa (USAN, INN)
- berahyaluronidase alfa-pmph
- beraprost (INN)
- berdazimer sodium (INN)
- berefrine (INN)
- beremagene geperpavec (USAN, INN)
- berlafenone (INN)
- bermoprofen (INN)
- Berocca PN
- beroctocog alfa (INN)
- Berotec
- bertilimumab (INN)
- bertosamil (INN)
- Berubigen
- berupipam (INN)
- berubicin (USAN)
- bervastatin (INN)
- berythromycin (INN)
- besifloxacin hydrochloride (USAN)
- besifovir (INN)
- besigomsin (INN)
- besilesomab (INN)
- besipirdine (INN)
- besonprodil (USAN)
- besulpamide (INN)
- besunide (INN)

=== bet ===
==== beta ====
- Beta-2
- Beta-HC
- Beta-Val

===== betac-betat =====
- betacarotene (INN)
- betacetylmethadol (INN)
- Betachron
- Betaderm
- betadex (INN)
- Betadine
- Betagan
- betahistine (INN)
- Betaject
- Betalin 12
- Betalin S
- Betaloc
- betameprodine (INN)
- betamethadol (INN)
- betamethasone acibutate (INN)
- betamethasone (INN)
- betamicin (INN)
- betamipron (INN)
- betanidine (INN)
- Betapace
- Betapar
- Betapen-VK
- betaprodine (INN)
- Betaprone
- Betasept
- Betaseron
- betasizofiran (INN)
- Betatar
- Betatrex

===== betax-betaz =====
- Betaxin
- betaxolol (INN)
- Betaxon
- betazole (INN)

==== beth-betr ====
- bethanechol (INN)
- betiatide (INN)
- betibeglogene autotemcel (USAN, INN)
- Betimol
- Betnesol
- Betnovate
- Betoptic Pilo
- Betoptic S
- betoxycaine (INN)
- betrixaban (USAN)

=== bev-bez ===
- Bevacip
- Bevaciptin
- bevacizumab (INN)
- bevacizumab-adcd
- bevacizumab-awwb
- bevacizumab-bvzr
- bevacizumab-maly
- bevacizumab-tnjn
- bevacizumab-vikg
- bevacizumab gamma (INN)
- bevantolol (INN)
- bevasiranib (USAN, INN)
- bevirimat (USAN, INN)
- bevonium metilsulfate bolenol (INN)
- Bexlutry
- Bexophene
- Bextra
- Bexxar
- Beyfortus
- Beyonttra
- bezafibrate (INN)
- Bezalip
- bezitramide (INN)

== bg ==
- BG 9273
