= C19H29NO2 =

The molecular formula C_{19}H_{29}NO_{2} (molar mass: 303.44 g/mol, exact mass: 303.2198 u) may refer to:

- Bornaprolol
- Nexeridine
