= TMC-310911 =

Chemical compound

Legal status
- Legal status: US: Investigational drug

Identifiers
- IUPAC name: [(3As,4R,6aR)-2,3,3a,4,5,6a-hexahydrofuro[2,3-b]furan-4-yl] N-[(2S,3R)-4-[[2-[(1-cyclopentylpiperidin-4-yl)amino]-1,3-benzothiazol-6-yl]sulfonyl-(2-methylpropyl)amino]-3-hydroxy-1-phenylbutan-2-yl]carbamate
- CAS Number: 1000287-05-7
- PubChem CID: 53361968
- DrugBank: DB15623
- ChemSpider: 34554561
- UNII: 0151W500HP

Chemical and physical data
- Formula: C_{38}H_{53}N_{5}O_{7}S_{2}
- Molar mass: 755.99 g·mol^{−1}
- 3D model (JSmol): Interactive image
- SMILES: CC(C)CN(C[C@H]([C@H](CC1=CC=CC=C1)NC(=O)O[C@H]2CO[C@@H]3[C@H]2CCO3)O)S(=O)(=O)C4=CC5=C(C=C4)N=C(S5)NC6CCN(CC6)C7CCCC7
- InChI: InChI=1S/C38H53N5O7S2/c1-25(2)22-43(23-33(44)32(20-26-8-4-3-5-9-26)41-38(45)50-34-24-49-36-30(34)16-19-48-36)52(46,47)29-12-13-31-35(21-29)51-37(40-31)39-27-14-17-42(18-15-27)28-10-6-7-11-28/h3-5,8-9,12-13,21,25,27-28,30,32-34,36,44H,6-7,10-11,14-20,22-24H2,1-2H3,(H,39,40)(H,41,45)/t30-,32-,33+,34-,36+/m0/s1; Key:JQUNFHFWXCXPRK-AMMMHQJVSA-N

TMC-310911 (also known as ASC-09) is an antiviral drug which was originally researched as a treatment for HIV/AIDS. It is a protease inhibitor related to darunavir. While TMC-310911 was not ultimately developed as a medication for the treatment of AIDS, research has continued into potential applications in the treatment of other viral diseases, and in March 2020 it was entered into clinical trials for the treatment of COVID-19.

== See also ==
- Brecanavir
- TMC-647055
