= C22H25N3O2 =

The molecular formula C_{22}H_{25}N_{3}O_{2} may refer to:

- Baxdrostat
- Bucindolol
