= C22H28N2O2 =

The molecular formula C_{22}H_{28}N_{2}O_{2} (molar mass : 352.47 g/mol) may refer to:

- Anileridine, an analgesic
- Betahydroxyfentanyl, an opioid analgesic
- Brefonalol, a beta blocker
- Encainide, an antiarrhythmic drug
- Methoxyacetylfentanyl, an opioid designer drug
- Tebufenozide, an insecticide
