= C23H27N3O4 =

The molecular formula C_{23}H_{27}N_{3}O_{4} may refer to:

- Benexate
- Ruvonoflast
