= C18H29NO3 =

The molecular formula C_{18}H_{29}NO_{3} (molar mass: 307.43 g/mol, exact mass: 307.2147 u) may refer to:

- Betaxolol
- Butamirate
- Dihydrocapsaicin
- Levobetaxolol
