= Intismeran autogene =

MRNA-based cancer vaccine

Intismeran autogene (previously known by its investigational drug name mRNA-4157/V940) is an mRNA based cancer vaccine encapsulated in solid lipid nanoparticles. The 34 mRNA sequences in mRNA-4157/V940 vaccine were generated by an automated algorithm integrated with workflow based on massive parallel sequencing of tissue generated from cancer patients. As adjuvant therapy, mRNA-4157 monotherapy and in combination with pembrolizumab have been investigated in patients with resected solid tumors (melanoma, bladder carcinoma, HPV negative HNSCC, NSCLC, SCLC, MSI-high, or TMB-high cancers). It was also investigated in patients with HNSCC and MSS-CRC.

== History ==
Clinical development of intismeran autogene: the twelve trials registered on ClinicalTrials.gov as of August 2026. Bars run from each trial's start date to its primary completion date, shaded by phase.

mRNA-4157/V940 was developed by Moderna starting in 2017. In May 2018, Moderna and MSD (Merck in US) announced collaboration on further development. In 2019 Moderna and Merck jointly put mRNA-4157/V940 into clinical trials in combination with Merck's cancer immunotherapy drug pembrolizumab in resected stage IIIB-IV melanoma. In December 2022, Moderna and MSD announced that the study met its endpoint and demonstrated superiority. In February 2023, the Food and Drug Administration granted mRNA-4157/V940 breakthrough status. In April 2023, mRNA-4157 in combination with pembrolizumab received Prime Scheme Designation from the European Medicines Agency.

In the 2023 AACR meeting, Jeffrey S. Weber, the deputy director of the Perlmutter Cancer Center, presented the primary analysis outcome from the open-label, 2:1 randomization phase 2b study. At the pre-specified analysis point when 42 recurrence-free survival (RFS) events occurred among 157 participants with resected stage IIIC–IV melanoma, 22.4% (24/107) in the mRNA-4157 plus pembrolizumab arm had recurrent disease, and 40% (20/50) in the pembrolizumab arm had recurrent disease, concluding that mRNA-4157 in combination with pembrolizumab reduced risk by 44% in surgical resected melanoma.

In July 2023, MSD and Moderna initiated the phase III study (study V940-001) evaluating mRNA-4157 in combination with pembrolizumab for adjuvant treatment of patients with resected high-risk stage IIB-stage IV melanoma.

In the meantime, a phase III study of V940 plus Pembrolizumab versus placebo plus pembrolizumab as adjuvant therapy in non-small cell lung cancer patient with resected stage II, IIIA, IIIB (N2) was registered and expected to start in November 2023. Patients who received prior neoadjuvant therapy for their current NSCLC diagnosis, or had been treated with any agent directed to stimulatory or coinhibitory T-cell receptors (e.g. PD-1, PD-L1, CTLA-4, et al.) were excluded.

On 19 August 2026, Merck and Moderna announced that the phase 3 INTerpath-001 trial (NCT05933577) had met both of its efficacy endpoints. In patients with completely resected stage IIB–IV cutaneous melanoma, intismeran autogene combined with pembrolizumab produced statistically significant improvements in recurrence-free survival and in distant metastasis-free survival compared with pembrolizumab alone. The trial randomized 1,137 patients 2:1 to intismeran autogene plus pembrolizumab or to placebo plus pembrolizumab. The companies reported no new safety signals. Detailed efficacy results, including overall survival, were not released at the time of the announcement. In October 2026, the companies reported that recurrence and mortality had been reduced by 42%.

== Registered clinical trials ==
Twelve trials of the agent are registered on ClinicalTrials.gov. Nine are designated phase 2 or phase 3; the remainder are the 2017 first-in-human study, a phase 1/2 study in urothelial carcinoma, and a phase 2/3 study in cutaneous squamous-cell carcinoma that was terminated in 2026, the registry giving the reason as "business reasons".

Registered clinical trials of intismeran autogene, as of August 2026
Trial	Phase	Population	Status	Enrollment	Started
KEYNOTE-603; NCT03313778	1	Advanced solid tumors	Active, not recruiting	161	2017-08
KEYNOTE-942; NCT03897881	2	Resected melanoma	Active, not recruiting	267	2019-07
INTerpath-001; NCT05933577	3	Resected stage IIB–IV melanoma	Active, not recruiting	1,089 (est.)	2023-07
INTerpath-002; NCT06077760	3	Resected NSCLC	Recruiting	868 (est.)	2023-12
INTerpath-005; NCT06305767	1/2	Muscle-invasive urothelial carcinoma	Active, not recruiting	230 (est.)	2024-03
INTerpath-004; NCT06307431	2	Resected renal cell carcinoma	Active, not recruiting	272 (est.)	2024-04
INTerpath-007; NCT06295809	2/3	Cutaneous squamous-cell carcinoma	Terminated	46	2024-04
NCT06623422	3	Resectable stage II–IIIB (N2) NSCLC	Recruiting	680 (est.)	2024-10
NCT06833073	2	High-risk non-muscle-invasive bladder cancer	Recruiting	308 (est.)	2025-03
NCT06961006	2	Melanoma	Recruiting	160 (est.)	2025-05
INTerpath-13; NCT07221474	2	First-line metastatic squamous NSCLC	Recruiting	180 (est.)	2025-12
INTerpath-014; NCT07513376	3	Resected NSCLC (subcutaneous pembrolizumab)	Recruiting	876 (est.)	2026-05

Individualized neoantigen cancer vaccines have largely remained in early-phase testing. Of the interventional trials of such vaccines registered on ClinicalTrials.gov, only ten have reached phase 3 or phase 2/3, and five of those are trials of intismeran autogene.

mRNA-4157 is experienced in a clinical trial (INTerpath-004) phase 2 (NCT06307431). In this trial, mRNA-4157 is combined with adjuvant pembrolizumab. It aimed to prevent relapse for patients with RCC who have already undergone nephrectomy.

== Mechanism of action ==
mRNA-4157/V940 is an mRNA based cancer vaccine. When administered, it will produce one of several dozen possible abnormal proteins commonly found in cancerous tissues. The production of those proteins is intended to invoke an immune response. mRNA-4157/V940 is given to patients after their tumors have been sequenced and abnormal proteins identified. The drug is then customized to match a patient's tumor, which makes it an example of personalized medicine.
