= Pembrolizumab =

Pharmaceutical drug used in cancer treatment

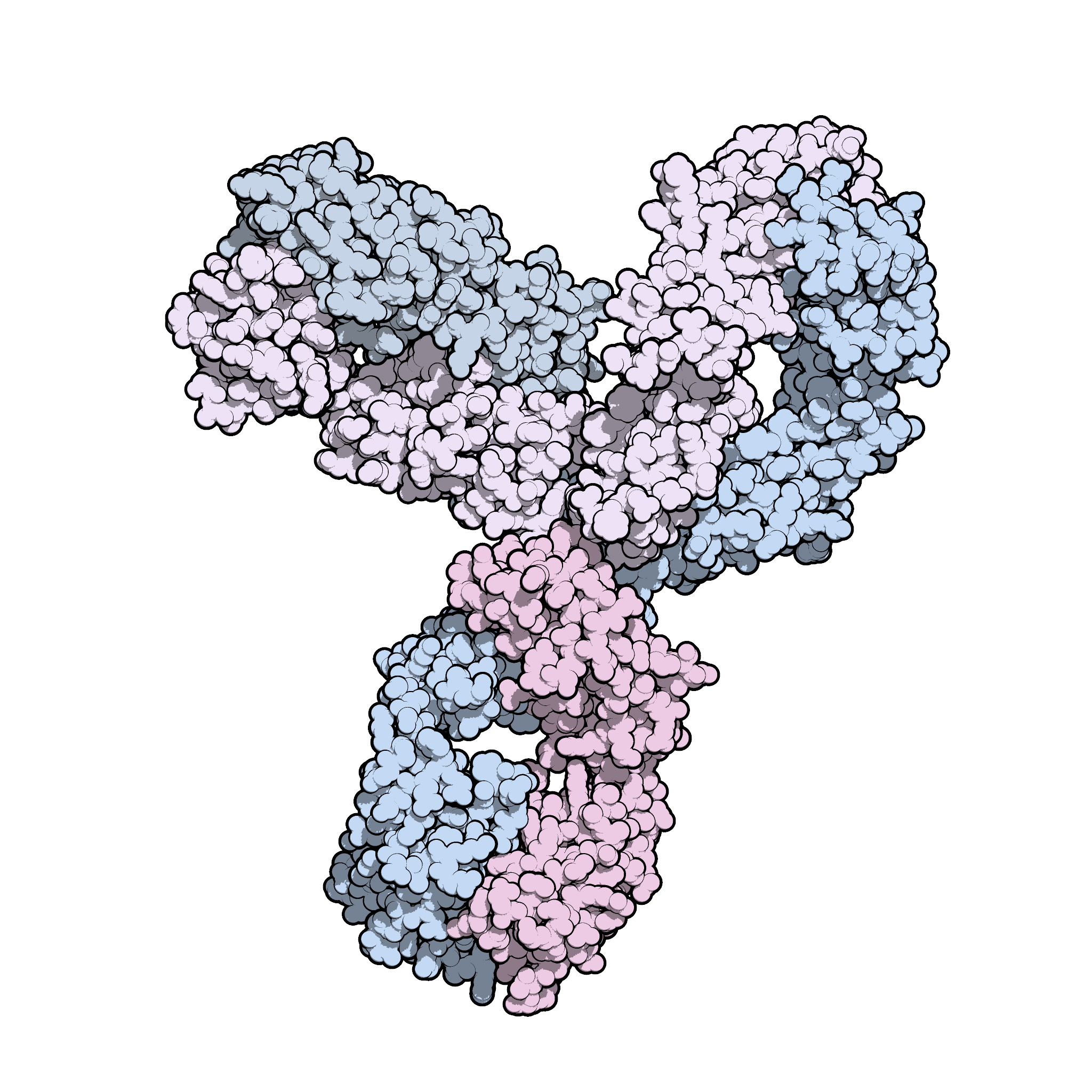
- From PDB entry 5dk3

Monoclonal antibody
- Type: Whole antibody
- Source: Humanized (from mouse)
- Target: PD-1

Clinical data
- Trade names: Keytruda
- Other names: MK-3475, lambrolizumab
- AHFS/Drugs.com: Monograph
- MedlinePlus: a614048
- License data: US DailyMed: Pembrolizumab
- Pregnancy category: AU: D
- Routes of administration: Intravenous
- Drug class: Antineoplastic
- ATC code: L01FF02 (WHO)

Legal status
- Legal status: AU: S4 (Prescription only); CA: ℞-only / Schedule D; UK: POM (Prescription only); US: ℞-only; EU: Rx-only; In general: ℞ (Prescription only)

Identifiers
- CAS Number: 1374853-91-4
- DrugBank: DB09037
- ChemSpider: none
- UNII: DPT0O3T46P
- KEGG: D10574
- ChEMBL: ChEMBL3137343
- ECHA InfoCard: 100.234.370

Chemical and physical data
- Formula: C_{6534}H_{10004}N_{1716}O_{2036}S_{46}
- Molar mass: 146648.64 g·mol^{−1}

Pembrolizumab, sold under the brand name Keytruda, is a humanized monoclonal antibody, more specifically a PD-1 inhibitor, used in cancer immunotherapy to treat many types of cancer. It is administered by slow intravenous injection.

Common side effects include fatigue, musculoskeletal pain, decreased appetite, itchy skin, diarrhea, nausea, rash, fever, cough, difficulty breathing, constipation, pain, and abdominal pain. It is an IgG4 isotype antibody that blocks a protective mechanism of cancer cells, allowing the immune system to destroy them. It targets the programmed cell death protein 1 (PD-1) receptor of lymphocytes.

Pembrolizumab was approved for medical use in the United States in 2014. It is on the World Health Organization's List of Essential Medicines. A fixed-dose combination of pembrolizumab and berahyaluronidase alfa, (Keytruda Qlex) was approved for medical use in the United States in September 2025.

== Medical uses ==
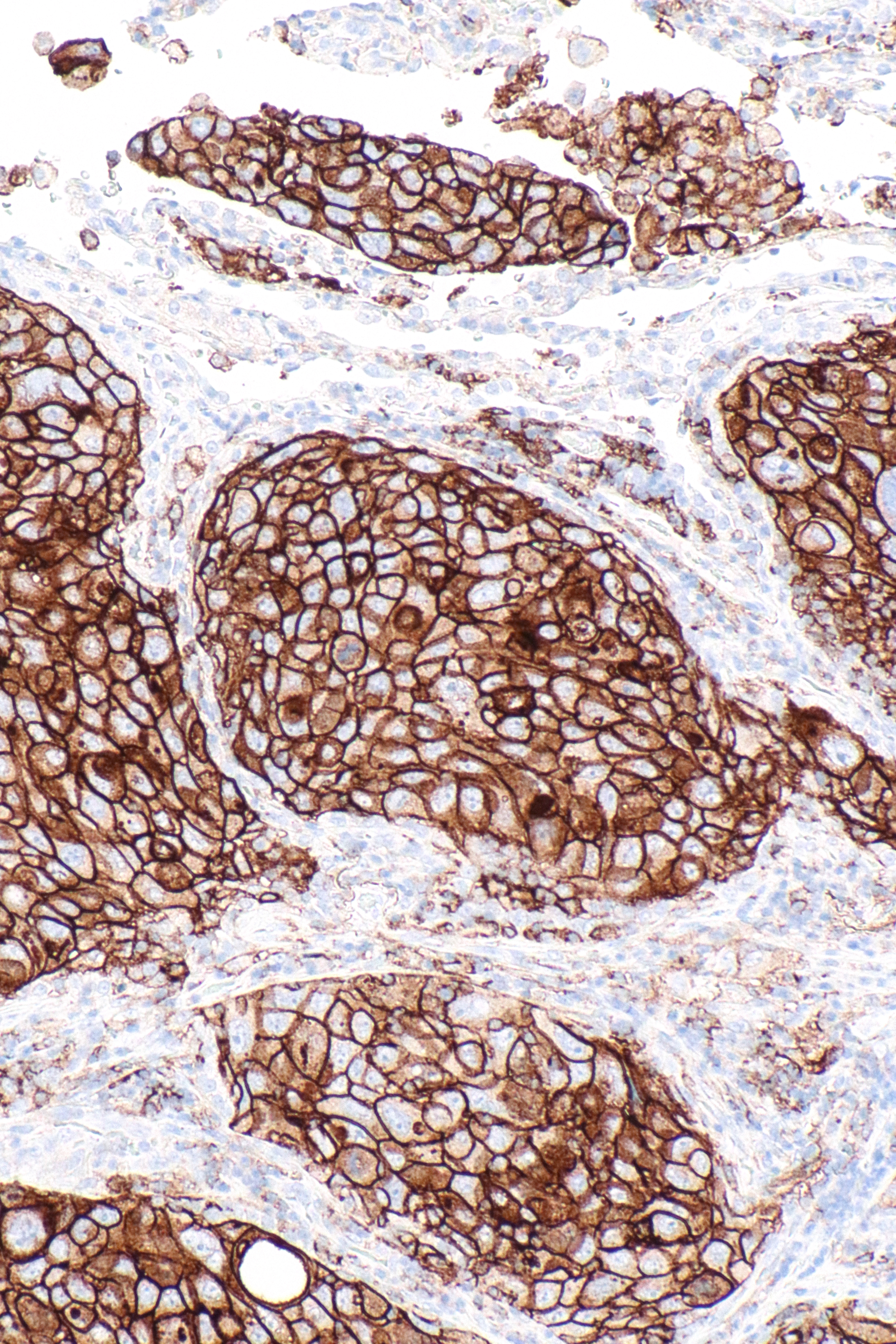
Micrograph showing a PD-L1 positive non-small cell lung carcinoma. PD-L1 immunostain

In the United States, pembrolizumab is indicated for the treatment of melanoma, non-small-cell lung cancer, malignant pleural mesothelioma, head and neck squamous-cell cancer, classical Hodgkin lymphoma, primary mediastinal large B-cell lymphoma, urothelial cancer, microsatellite instability-high or mismatch repair deficient cancer, microsatellite instability-high or mismatch repair deficient colorectal cancer, gastric cancer, esophageal cancer, cervical cancer, hepatocellular carcinoma, biliary tract cancer, Merkel-cell carcinoma, renal cell carcinoma, endometrial carcinoma, tumor mutational burden-high cancer, cutaneous squamous cell carcinoma, and triple-negative breast cancer.

As of 2019, pembrolizumab is used via intravenous infusion to treat inoperable or metastatic melanoma, metastatic non-small cell lung cancer (NSCLC) in certain situations, as a first-line treatment for metastatic bladder cancer in people who cannot receive cisplatin-based chemotherapy and have high levels of PD-L1, as a second-line treatment for head and neck squamous cell carcinoma (HNSCC), after platinum-based chemotherapy, for the treatment of people with refractory classic Hodgkin lymphoma, and recurrent locally advanced or metastatic esophageal squamous cell carcinoma.

For non-small cell lung cancer, pembrolizumab is used in combination with chemotherapy (for all PD-L1, a PD-1 receptor ligand, levels) or by itself as a first-line treatment if the cancer expresses (≥ 1%) PD-L1 and the cancer has no mutations in EGFR or in ALK; if chemotherapy has already been administered, then pembrolizumab can be used as a second-line treatment, but if the cancer has EGFR or ALK mutations, agents targeting those mutations should be used first. Assessment of PD-L1 expression must be conducted with a validated and approved companion diagnostic.

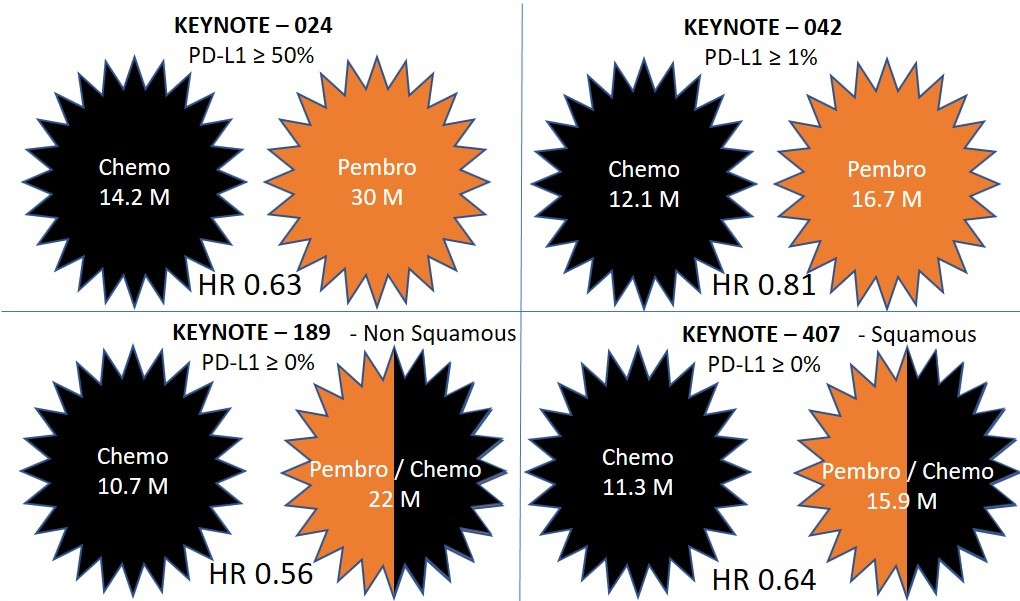
Pembrolizumab (Pembro) use for treatment of lung cancer in the first line with or without chemotherapy (Chemo). Median overall survival in months (M). Hazard Ratio (HR).

In 2017, the US Food and Drug Administration (FDA) approved pembrolizumab for any unresectable or metastatic solid tumor with certain genetic anomalies (mismatch repair deficiency or microsatellite instability). This was the first time the FDA approved a cancer drug based on tumor genetics rather than tissue type or tumor site; therefore, pembrolizumab is a so-called tissue-agnostic drug.

In the European Union, pembrolizumab is indicated for:

- the treatment of advanced (unresectable or metastatic) melanoma in adults as monotherapy.
- the adjuvant treatment of adults with Stage III melanoma and lymph node involvement who have undergone complete resection as monotherapy.
- the first-line treatment of metastatic non-small cell lung carcinoma in adults whose tumors express PD-L1 with a ≥ 50% tumor proportion score (TPS) with no EGFR or ALK positive tumor mutations as monotherapy.
- the first-line treatment of metastatic non-squamous non-small cell lung cancer in adults whose tumors have no EGFR or ALK positive mutations in combination with pemetrexed and platinum chemotherapy.
- the first-line treatment of metastatic squamous non-small cell lung cancer in adults in combination with carboplatin and either paclitaxel or nab-paclitaxel.
- the treatment of locally advanced or metastatic non-small cell lung cancer in adults whose tumors express PD-L1 with a ≥ 1% TPS and who have received at least one prior chemotherapy regimen. People with EGFR or ALK positive tumor mutations should also have received targeted therapy before receiving Keytruda as monotherapy.
- the treatment of adults with relapsed or refractory classical Hodgkin lymphoma who have failed autologous stem cell transplant (ASCT) and brentuximab vedotin (BV), or who are transplant-ineligible and have failed BV as monotherapy.
- the treatment of locally advanced or metastatic urothelial carcinoma in adults who have received prior platinum-containing chemotherapy as monotherapy.
- the treatment of locally advanced or metastatic urothelial carcinoma in adults who are not eligible for cisplatin-containing chemotherapy and whose tumors express PD L1 with a combined positive score (CPS) ≥ 10 as monotherapy.
- the first-line treatment of metastatic or unresectable recurrent head and neck squamous cell carcinoma in adults whose tumors express PD-L1 with a CPS ≥ 1 as monotherapy or in combination with platinum and 5-fluorouracil (5-FU) chemotherapy.
- the treatment of recurrent or metastatic head and neck squamous cell carcinoma in adults whose tumors express PD-L1 with a ≥ 50% TPS and progressing on or after platinum-containing chemotherapy as monotherapy.
- the first-line treatment of advanced renal cell carcinoma in adults in combination with axitinib.

In June 2020, the US FDA approved an indication for pembrolizumab as the first-line treatment for people with unresectable or metastatic microsatellite instability-high or mismatch repair deficient colorectal cancer. The approval marks the first immunotherapy approved for that population in the US as a first-line treatment and which is administered to people without also giving chemotherapy.

In March 2021, the US FDA approved pembrolizumab in combination with platinum and fluoropyrimidine-based chemotherapy to treat metastatic or locally advanced esophageal or gastroesophageal (GEJ) (tumors with epicenter 1 to 5 centimeters above the gastroesophageal junction) carcinoma in people who are not candidates for surgical resection or definitive chemoradiation. Efficacy was evaluated in KEYNOTE-590 (NCT03189719), a multicenter, randomized, placebo-controlled trial that enrolled 749 participants with metastatic or locally advanced esophageal or gastroesophageal junction carcinoma who were not candidates for surgical resection or definitive chemoradiation.

In May 2021, the US FDA approved pembrolizumab in combination with trastuzumab, fluoropyrimidine- and platinum-containing chemotherapy for the first-line treatment of people with locally advanced unresectable or metastatic HER2 positive gastric or gastroesophageal junction (GEJ) adenocarcinoma. Approval was based on the prespecified interim analysis of the first 264 participants of the ongoing KEYNOTE-811 (NCT03615326) trial, a multicenter, randomized, double‑blind, placebo‑controlled trial in participants with HER2‑positive advanced gastric or gastroesophageal junction (GEJ) adenocarcinoma who had not previously received systemic therapy for metastatic disease.

In July 2021, the US FDA approved pembrolizumab for high-risk, early-stage, triple-negative breast cancer in combination with chemotherapy as neoadjuvant treatment, and then continued as a single agent as adjuvant treatment after surgery. The FDA also granted regular approval to pembrolizumab in combination with chemotherapy for people with locally recurrent unresectable or metastatic triple-negative breast cancer whose tumors express PD-L1 (Combined Positive Score [CPS] ≥ 10) as determined by an FDA-approved test.

In November 2021, the US FDA approved pembrolizumab for the adjuvant treatment of people twelve years of age and older with stage IIB or IIC melanoma following complete resection.

In November 2021, the US FDA approved pembrolizumab for the adjuvant treatment of renal cell carcinoma for people at intermediate-high or high risk of recurrence following nephrectomy. Approval was based on KEYNOTE-564, a multicenter, randomized (1:1), double-blind, placebo-controlled trial in 994 participants with intermediate-high or high risk of recurrence of RCC, or M1 no evidence of disease.

In March 2022, the US FDA approved pembrolizumab for the treatment of advanced endometrial cancer.

In January 2023, the US FDA approved pembrolizumab for adjuvant treatment following resection and platinum-based chemotherapy for stage IB (T2a ≥ 4 cm), II, or IIIA non-small cell lung cancer.

In October 2023, the US FDA approved pembrolizumab to be used with gemcitabine and cisplatin for locally advanced unresectable or metastatic biliary tract cancer.

In January 2024, the US FDA approved pembrolizumab, in combination with chemoradiotherapy for the treatment of people with FIGO (International Federation of Gynecology and Obstetrics) 2014 Stage III-IVA cervical cancer.

In June 2024, the US FDA approved pembrolizumab with carboplatin and paclitaxel, followed by single-agent pembrolizumab, for adults with primary advanced or recurrent endometrial carcinoma.

In September 2024, the US FDA approved pembrolizumab with pemetrexed and platinum chemotherapy as first-line treatment of unresectable advanced or metastatic malignant pleural mesothelioma.

In March 2025, the US FDA granted traditional approval to pembrolizumab with trastuzumab, fluoropyrimidine- and platinum-containing chemotherapy for the first-line treatment of adults with locally advanced unresectable or metastatic HER2-positive gastric or gastroesophageal junction adenocarcinoma whose tumors express PD-L1 (CPS ≥1). Pembrolizumab previously received accelerated approval for this indication in May 2021. Efficacy was evaluated in KEYNOTE-811 (NCT03615326), a multicenter, randomized, double-blind, placebo-controlled trial enrolling 698 participants with HER2-positive advanced gastric or GEJ adenocarcinoma not previously treated with systemic therapy for metastatic disease. Among the 698 participants, 594 (85%) had tumors expressing PD-L1 with a CPS ≥1 using the PD-L1 IHC 22C3 pharmDx kit. Participants were randomized (1:1) to pembrolizumab 200 mg or placebo, in combination with trastuzumab and either fluorouracil plus cisplatin or capecitabine plus oxaliplatin.

In June 2025, the US FDA approved neoadjuvant and adjuvant pembrolizumab for resectable locally advanced head and neck squamous cell carcinoma. The FDA approved pembrolizumab for adults with resectable locally advanced head and neck squamous cell carcinoma whose tumors express PD-L1 as determined by an FDA-approved test, as a single agent as neoadjuvant treatment, continued as adjuvant treatment in combination with radiotherapy with or without cisplatin after surgery, and then as a single agent. It is the first approval for head and neck squamous cell carcinoma in six years and the first overall perioperative approval for locally advanced head and neck squamous cell carcinoma.

In November 2025, the US FDA approved pembrolizumab or pembrolizumab and berahyaluronidase alfa with enfortumab vedotin as neoadjuvant treatment followed by adjuvant treatment after cystectomy for adults with muscle invasive bladder cancer who are ineligible for cisplatin.

== Adverse effects ==
People have had severe infusion-related reactions to pembrolizumab. There have also been severe immune-related adverse effects including lung inflammation (including fatal cases) and inflammation of endocrine organs that caused inflammation of the pituitary gland, of the thyroid (causing both hypothyroidism and hyperthyroidism in different people), and pancreatitis that caused Type 1 diabetes and diabetic ketoacidosis; some people have had to go on lifelong hormone therapy as a result (e.g. insulin therapy or thyroid hormones). People have also had colon inflammation, liver inflammation, kidney inflammation due to the drug.

The common adverse reactions have been fatigue (24%), rash (19%), itchiness (pruritus) (17%), diarrhea (12%), nausea (11%) and joint pain (arthralgia) (10%).

Other adverse effects occurring in between 1% and 10% of people taking pembrolizumab have included anemia, decreased appetite, headache, dizziness, distortion of the sense of taste, dry eye, high blood pressure, abdominal pain, constipation, dry mouth, severe skin reactions, vitiligo, various kinds of acne, dry skin, eczema, muscle pain, pain in a limb, arthritis, weakness, edema, fever, chills, myasthenia gravis, and flu-like symptoms.

== Mechanism of action ==
Pembrolizumab is a therapeutic antibody that binds to and blocks PD-1 located on lymphocytes. This receptor is generally responsible for preventing the immune system from attacking the body's own tissues; it is a so-called immune checkpoint. Normally, the PD-1 receptor on activated T-cells binds to the PD-L1 or PD-L2 ligands present on normal cells in the body, deactivating any potential cell-mediated immune response against these cells. Many cancers make proteins such as PD-L1 that also bind to the PD-1 receptor, thus shutting down the ability of the body to kill the cancer. Pembrolizumab works by inhibiting lymphocytes' PD-1 receptors, blocking the ligands that would deactivate it and prevent an immune response. This allows the immune system to target and destroy cancer cells, but also blocks a key mechanism preventing the immune system from attacking the body itself. This checkpoint inhibitor function of pembrolizumab thus has immune-dysfunction side effects as a result.

Tumors often have mutations that cause impaired DNA mismatch repair. This in turn often results in microsatellite instability allowing the tumor to generate numerous mutant proteins that could serve as tumor antigens, triggering an immune response against the tumor. By preventing the self-checkpoint system from blocking the T-cells, pembrolizumab appears to facilitate clearance of any such tumor by the immune system.

== Pharmacology ==
Since pembrolizumab is cleared from the circulation through non-specific catabolism, no metabolic drug interactions are expected and no studies were done on routes of elimination. The systemic clearance [rate] is about 0.2 L/day and the terminal half-life is about 25 days.

== Chemistry and manufacturing ==
Pembrolizumab is an immunoglobulin G4, with a variable region against the human PD-1 receptor, a humanized mouse monoclonal [228-L-proline(H10-S>P)]γ4 heavy chain (134-218') disulfide and a humanized mouse monoclonal κ light chain dimer (226-226:229-229)-bisdisulfide.

It is recombinantly manufactured in Chinese hamster ovary (CHO) cells.

== History ==
Pembrolizumab was invented by scientists at Organon after which they worked with Medical Research Council Technology (which became LifeArc) starting in 2006, to humanize the antibody; Schering-Plough acquired Organon in 2007, and Merck & Co. acquired Schering-Plough two years later. Inventors Gregory Carven, Hans van Eenennaam and Gradus Dulos were recognized as Inventors of the Year by the Intellectual Property Owners Education Foundation in 2016.

The development program for pembrolizumab was seen as high priority at Organon, but low at Schering and later Merck. In early 2010, Merck terminated development and began preparing to out-license it. Later, in 2010, scientists from Bristol Myers Squibb published a paper in The New England Journal of Medicine showing that their checkpoint inhibitor, ipilimumab (Yervoy), had shown strong promise in treating metastatic melanoma and that a second Bristol Myers Squibb checkpoint inhibitor, nivolumab (Opdivo), was also promising. Merck at that time had little commitment or expertise in either oncology or immunotherapy, but understood the opportunity and reacted strongly, reactivating the program and filing its IND by the end of 2010. As one example, Martin Huber was one of the few senior people at Merck with strong experience in lung cancer drug development, but had been promoted to senior management and was no longer involved in product development. He stepped down from his role to lead clinical development of pembrolizumab for lung cancer.

Scientists at the company argued for developing a companion diagnostic and limiting testing of the drug only to patients with biomarkers showing they were likely to respond, and received agreement from management. Some people, including shareholders and analysts, criticized this decision as it limited the potential market size for the drug, while others argued it increased the chances of proving the drug would work and would make clinical trials faster. (The trials would need fewer participants because of the likelihood of greater effect size.) Moving quickly and reducing the risk of failure was essential for catching up with Bristol-Myers Squibb, which had an approximate five year lead over Merck. The phase I study started in early 2011, and Eric Rubin, who was running the melanoma trial, argued for and was able to win expansion of the trial until it reached around 1300 people. This was the largest phase I study ever run in oncology, with the participants roughly divided between melanoma and lung cancer.

In 2013, Merck quietly applied for and won a breakthrough therapy designation for the drug. This regulatory pathway was new at the time and not well understood. One of its advantages is that the US FDA holds more frequent meetings with drug developers, reducing the risk of developers of making mistakes or misunderstandings arising from the differences between regulators' expectations and what the developers want to do. This was Merck's first use of the designation and the reduction in regulatory risk was one of the reasons management was willing to put company resources into development.

In 2013, the United States Adopted Name (USAN) name was changed from lambrolizumab to pembrolizumab. In that year clinical trial results in advanced melanoma were published in The New England Journal of Medicine. This was part of the large phase I NCT01295827 trial.

In September 2014, the US Food and Drug Administration (FDA) approved pembrolizumab under the Fast Track Development Program. It is approved for use following treatment with ipilimumab, or after treatment with ipilimumab and a BRAF inhibitor in advanced melanoma patients who carry a BRAF mutation.

As of 2015, the only PD-1/PD-L1 targeting drugs on the market are pembrolizumab and nivolumab.

By April 2016, Merck applied for approval to market the drug in Japan and signed an agreement with Taiho Pharmaceutical to co-promote it there.

In July 2015, pembrolizumab received marketing approval in the European Union.

In October 2015, the US FDA approved pembrolizumab for the treatment of metastatic non-small cell lung cancer (NSCLC) in people whose tumors express PD-L1 and who have failed treatment with other chemotherapeutic agents.

In July 2016, the US FDA accepted for priority review an application for recurrent or metastatic head and neck squamous cell carcinoma (HNSCC) after a platinum-based chemotherapy. They granted accelerated approval to pembrolizumab as a treatment for patients with recurrent or metastatic head and neck squamous cell carcinoma ("regardless of PD-L1 staining") following progression on a platinum-based chemotherapy, based on objective response rates (ORR) in the phase Ib KEYNOTE-012 study in August of the same year.

In October 2016, the US FDA approved pembrolizumab for the treatment of people with metastatic non-small cell lung cancer whose tumors express PD-L1 as determined by an FDA-approved test.

In May 2017, pembrolizumab received an accelerated approval from the US FDA for use in any unresectable or metastatic solid tumor with DNA mismatch repair deficiencies or a microsatellite instability-high state (or, in the case of colon cancer, tumors that have progressed following chemotherapy). This approval marked the first instance in which the FDA approved marketing of a drug based only on the presence of a genetic mutation, with no limitation on the site of the cancer or the kind of tissue in which it originated. The approval was based on a clinical trial of 149 participants with microsatellite instability-high or mismatch repair deficient cancers who enrolled on one of five single-arm trials. Ninety participants had colorectal cancer, and 59 participants had one of 14 other cancer types. The objective response rate for all participants was 39.6%. Response rates were similar across all cancer types, including 36% in colorectal cancer and 46% across the other tumor types. Notably, there were 11 complete responses, with the remainder partial responses. Responses lasted for at least six months in 78% of responders. Because the clinical trial was fairly small, Merck is obligated to conduct further post-marketing studies to ensure that the results are valid. Pembrolizumab was granted orphan drug designation for small-cell lung cancer in October 2017.

In June 2018, the US FDA approved pembrolizumab for use in both advanced cervical cancer for PD-L1 positive patients and for the treatment of adult and pediatric patients with refractory primary mediastinal large B-cell lymphoma (PMBCL), or who have relapsed after two or more prior lines of therapy.

In August 2018, the US FDA updated the prescribing information for pembrolizumab to require the use of an FDA-approved companion diagnostic test to determine PD-L1 levels in tumor tissue from patients with locally advanced or metastatic urothelial cancer who are cisplatin-ineligible. On 16 August 2018, the FDA approved the Dako PD-L1 IHC 22C3 PharmDx Assay (Dako North America, Inc.) as a companion diagnostic to select patients with locally advanced or metastatic urothelial carcinoma who are cisplatin-ineligible for treatment with pembrolizumab. The 22C3 assay determines PD-L1 expression by using a combined positive score (CPS) assessing PD-L1 staining in tumor and immune cells. As of August 2018, pembrolizumab is indicated for the treatment of those with locally advanced or metastatic urothelial carcinoma who are not eligible for cisplatin-containing chemotherapy and whose tumors express PD-L1 [Combined Positive Score (CPS) ≥ 10] as determined by an FDA-approved test, or in patients who are not eligible for any platinum-containing chemotherapy regardless of PD-L1 status.

In November 2018, the US FDA granted accelerated approval to pembrolizumab for those with hepatocellular carcinoma (HCC) who have been previously treated with sorafenib.

In February 2019, the US FDA approved pembrolizumab for the adjuvant treatment of patients with melanoma with involvement of lymph node(s) following complete resection. The FDA granted the application orphan drug designation.

In June 2019, the US FDA granted accelerated approval to pembrolizumab for those with metastatic small cell lung cancer (SCLC) with disease progression on or after platinum-based chemotherapy and at least one other prior line of therapy, and the FDA approved pembrolizumab for the first-line treatment of patients with metastatic or unresectable recurrent head and neck squamous cell carcinoma (HNSCC). Pembrolizumab was approved for use in combination with platinum and fluorouracil (FU) for all patients and as a single agent for patients whose tumors express PD‑L1 (Combined Positive Score [CPS] ≥ 1) as determined by an FDA‑approved test. The FDA also expanded the intended use for the PD-L1 IHC 22C3 pharmDx kit to include use as a companion diagnostic device for selecting patients with head and neck squamous cell carcinoma for treatment with pembrolizumab as a single agent.

In July 2019, the US FDA approved pembrolizumab for patients with recurrent, locally advanced or metastatic, squamous cell carcinoma of the esophagus (ESCC) whose tumors express PD-L1 (Combined Positive Score [CPS] ≥ 10), as determined by an FDA-approved test, with disease progression after one or more prior lines of systemic therapy. The FDA also approved a new use for the PD-L1 IHC 22C3 pharmDx kit as a companion diagnostic device for selecting patients for the above indication.

In June 2020, the US FDA approved pembrolizumab as monotherapy for the treatment of adults and children with unresectable or metastatic tumor mutational burden-high (TMB-H) [≥ 10 mutations/megabase (mut/Mb)] solid tumors, as determined by an FDA-approved test, that have progressed following prior treatment and who have no satisfactory alternative treatment options.

In March 2021, the accelerated approval indication in the US for the treatment of people with metastatic small-cell lung cancer (SCLC) was removed.

In January 2024, the FDA approved pembrolizumab, in combination with chemoradiotherapy, for people with FIGO 2014 Stage III-IVA cervical cancer. Efficacy was evaluated in KEYNOTE-A18 (NCT04221945), a multicenter, randomized, double-blind, placebo-controlled trial enrolling 1060 participants with cervical cancer who had not previously received definitive surgery, radiation, or systemic therapy. The trial included 596 participants with FIGO 2014 Stage III-IVA disease and 462 participants with FIGO 2014 Stage IB2-IIB, node-positive disease.

In June 2024, the US FDA approved pembrolizumab with carboplatin and paclitaxel, followed by single-agent pembrolizumab, for adults with primary advanced or recurrent endometrial carcinoma. Efficacy was evaluated in KEYNOTE-868/NRG-GY018 (NCT03914612), a multicenter, randomized, double-blind, placebo-controlled trial enrolling 810 participants with advanced or recurrent endometrial carcinoma. The trial included two separate cohorts based on mismatch repair status: 222 participants in the mismatch repair deficient cohort, and 588 participants in the mismatch repair proficient cohort.

Efficacy was evaluated in KEYNOTE-905/EV-303 (NCT03924895), an open-label, randomized, multi-center, active-controlled trial in 344 participants with previously untreated muscle invasive bladder cancer who were candidates for radical cystectomy with pelvic lymph node dissection but were ineligible for or declined cisplatin-based chemotherapy. Participants were randomized (1:1) to receive neoadjuvant pembrolizumab and enfortumab vedotin followed by surgery followed by adjuvant enfortumab vedotin in combination with pembrolizumab followed by pembrolizumab as a single agent or to undergo immediate surgery alone.

== Society and culture ==
=== Economics ===
Pembrolizumab was priced at US$150,000 per year when it launched in 2014.

It was added to the Cancer Drugs Fund list of NHS England in November 2022 after a deal with manufacturer Merck Sharp and Dohme, the details of which remain confidential.

Keytruda was the world's top-selling drug in 2024, with $29.5 billion in sales.

== Research ==
In 2015, Merck reported results in thirteen cancer types; much attention was given to early results in head and neck cancer.

As of May 2016, pembrolizumab was in phase IB clinical trials for triple-negative breast cancer (TNBC), gastric cancer, urothelial cancer, and head and neck cancer (all under the "Keynote-012" trial) and in phase II trial for TNBC (the "Keynote-086" trial). At ASCO, in June 2016, Merck reported that the clinical development program was directed to around 30 cancers and that it was running over 270 clinical trials (around 100 in combination with other treatments) and had four registration-enabling studies in process.

Results of a phase III clinical trial in triple-negative breast cancer were reported in October 2019.

Results of a phase II clinical trial in Merkel-cell carcinoma were reported in June 2016.

Results of a clinical trial in people with untreatable metastases arising from various solid tumors were reported in 2017.

A clinical phase III trial in combination with epacadostat, an Indoleamine 2,3-dioxygenase (IDO1) inhibitor to treat melanoma was completed in 2019.

In 2021, researchers reported the results of a five-year follow-up study.

In January 2022, a combination clinical trial of pembrolizumab and NL-201, a de novo protein undergoing a phase I clinical trial in people with advanced, relapsed or refractory solid tumors.

In March 2023, Merck reported the results of NRG-GY018, a phase III clinical trial in people with stage three to four or recurrent endometrial carcinoma.

In 2022, mRNA-4157/V940 drug candidate, a cancer vaccine, was studied alongside pembrolizumab for treatment of skin and pancreatic cancers. mRNA-4157/V940 went on to be granted breakthrough therapy designation by the FDA.
