= Keliximab =

Monoclonal antibody

Monoclonal antibody
- Type: Whole antibody
- Source: Chimeric (primate/human)
- Target: CD4

Clinical data
- Routes of administration: intravenous
- ATC code: none

Identifiers
- CAS Number: 174722-30-6
- ChemSpider: none
- UNII: 62L6LCF5EU

Keliximab is a monoclonal antibody for the treatment of severe chronic asthma. It suppresses the immune reaction by binding to white blood cells via the protein CD4. The drug is a chimeric antibody from Macaca irus and Homo sapiens.
