= Blosozumab =

Chemical compound

Monoclonal antibody
- Type: Whole antibody
- Source: Humanized (from mouse)
- Target: SOST

Clinical data
- ATC code: none

Identifiers
- CAS Number: 1132758-87-2
- ChemSpider: none
- UNII: 83YOM0NEL5
- KEGG: D10094

Chemical and physical data
- Formula: C_{6462}H_{9852}N_{1684}O_{2030}S_{46}
- Molar mass: 145086.42 g·mol^{−1}

Blosozumab binds SOST, a negative regulator of osteoblast activity. Blocking SOST activity can lead to increased bone density. Blosozaumab has been studied with regard to the treatment of osteoporosis in both men and postmenopausal women. Clinical trials with Blosozumab have shown the antibody to be well tolerated and effective in producing a bone anabolic effect.

Blosozumab was developed by Eli Lilly and Company.
