= T-cell activation RhoGTPase activating protein =

Protein-coding gene in the species Homo sapiens

TAGAP

Identifiers
- Aliases: TAGAP, ARHGAP47, IDDM21, TAGAP1, FKSG15, T-cell activation RhoGTPase activating protein, T cell activation RhoGTPase activating protein
- External IDs: OMIM: 609667; MGI: 3615484; GeneCards: TAGAP

Gene location (Human)
Chr.	Chromosome 6 (human)
Band	6q25.3	Start	159,034,468 bp
Band	6q25.3	End	159,045,152 bp

Gene location (Mouse)
Chr.	Chromosome 17 (mouse)
Band	17|17 A1	Start	8,144,832 bp
Band	17|17 A1	End	8,153,729 bp
RNA expression pattern
Bgee	Human / Mouse (ortholog); Top expressed in: bone marrow cell; blood; granulocyte; monocyte; appendix; trabecular bone; lymph node; mucosa of ileum; superficial temporal artery; spleen / Top expressed in: granulocyte; spleen; uterus; spermatocyte; bone marrow; thymus; urinary bladder; adrenal gland; morula; white adipose tissue; More reference expression data
BioGPS	n/a
Gene ontology
Molecular function	guanyl-nucleotide exchange factor activity; GTPase activator activity
Cellular component	cytosol
Biological process	positive regulation of GTPase activity; regulation of small GTPase mediated signal transduction; signal transduction
Sources:Amigo / QuickGO
Orthologs
Databases	NCBI: entry; OMA: entry
Species	Human	Mouse
Entrez	117289	72536
Ensembl	ENSG00000164691	ENSMUSG00000033450
UniProt	Q8N103	B2RWW0
RefSeq (mRNA)	NM_152133; NM_001278733; NM_054114; NM_138810	NM_145968
RefSeq (protein)	NP_001265662; NP_473455; NP_620165; NP_687034	NP_666080
Location (UCSC)	Chr 6: 159.03 – 159.05 Mb	Chr 17: 8.14 – 8.15 Mb
PubMed search
- Wikidata
View/Edit Human	View/Edit Mouse

T-cell activation RhoGTPase activating protein is a protein that in humans is encoded by the TAGAP gene.

== Function ==
This gene encodes a member of the Rho GTPase-activator protein superfamily. The encoded protein may function as a Rho GTPase-activating protein. Alterations in this gene may be associated with several diseases, including rheumatoid arthritis, celiac disease, and multiple sclerosis. Alternate splicing results in multiple transcript variants encoding distinct isoforms.
