= Nexeridine =

Chemical compound

Clinical data
- ATC code: None

Identifiers
- IUPAC name: 1-[1-(Dimethylamino)-2-propanyl]-2-phenylcyclohexyl acetate
- CAS Number: 53716-48-6 53716-47-5 (HCl)
- PubChem CID: 10447719
- ChemSpider: 8623136
- UNII: 8CM77ZQ65K
- CompTox Dashboard (EPA): DTXSID001023865

Chemical and physical data
- Formula: C_{19}H_{29}NO_{2}
- Molar mass: 303.446 g·mol^{−1}
- 3D model (JSmol): Interactive image
- SMILES: CN(C)C[C@@H](C)[C@@]1(OC(=O)C)CCCC[C@H]1c1ccccc1
- InChI: InChI=1S/C19H29NO2/c1-15(14-20(3)4)19(22-16(2)21)13-9-8-12-18(19)17-10-6-5-7-11-17/h5-7,10-11,15,18H,8-9,12-14H2,1-4H3; Key:TVQPXLMQOZWEBA-UHFFFAOYSA-N

Nexeridine (INN; USAN: nexeridine hydrochloride; code name Compound 673-082) is an opioid analgesic with a similar structure to those of pethidine and tramadol. It was synthesized and assayed in 1975 but was never marketed. The active isomer is (1R,2S)-1-[(2R)-1-(dimethylamino)-2-propanyl]-2-phenylcyclohexyl acetate.
