= Benactyzine =

Chemical compound

Clinical data
- AHFS/Drugs.com: International Drug Names
- Routes of administration: Oral
- ATC code: none

Legal status
- Legal status: BR: Class C1 (Other controlled substances); In general: ℞ (Prescription only)

Identifiers
- IUPAC name: 2-(diethylamino)ethyl hydroxy(diphenyl)acetate
- CAS Number: 302-40-9
- PubChem CID: 9330
- DrugBank: DB09023
- ChemSpider: 8966
- UNII: 595EG71R3F
- KEGG: D07498
- ChEMBL: ChEMBL70352
- CompTox Dashboard (EPA): DTXSID0022644
- ECHA InfoCard: 100.005.568

Chemical and physical data
- Formula: C_{20}H_{25}NO_{3}
- Molar mass: 327.424 g·mol^{−1}
- 3D model (JSmol): Interactive image
- SMILES: O=C(OCCN(CC)CC)C(O)(c1ccccc1)c2ccccc2
- InChI: InChI=1S/C20H25NO3/c1-3-21(4-2)15-16-24-19(22)20(23,17-11-7-5-8-12-17)18-13-9-6-10-14-18/h5-14,23H,3-4,15-16H2,1-2H3; Key:IVQOFBKHQCTVQV-UHFFFAOYSA-N

Benactyzine is an anticholinergic drug that was used in the treatment of clinical depression and anxiety disorders before it was pulled from the U.S. market by the FDA due to serious side effects.

Its use for these indications was limited by side effects such as dry mouth and nausea, and at high doses it can cause more severe symptoms such as deliriant and hallucinogenic effects. "Large doses of benactyzine in normal subjects may produce a state resembling the action of mescaline or LSD."

Brand names have included: Suavitil, Phebex, Phobex, Cedad, Cevanol, Deprol, Lucidil, Morcain, Nutinal, Parasan. While there was some tentative evidence of effectiveness when combined with meprobamate, with the medication no longer available it is not clinically important.

== History ==
Benactyzine was brought to market in the US in 1957 by Merck under the tradename, Suavitil.

== See also ==
- Benapryzine
