= Benapryzine =

Abandoned anticholinergic

Clinical data
- Trade names: Brizin
- Other names: Benapryzine; Beneprizine; Benepryzine; BRL-1288; BRL1288; AP-1288; AP1288
- Routes of administration: Oral

Identifiers
- IUPAC name: 2-[ethyl(propyl)amino]ethyl 2-hydroxy-2,2-diphenylacetate
- CAS Number: 22487-42-9 3202-55-9 (hydrochloride)
- PubChem CID: 18551
- ChemSpider: 17520
- UNII: 14FPC4V3AX
- ChEBI: CHEBI:191253
- ChEMBL: ChEMBL2110766
- CompTox Dashboard (EPA): DTXSID00865055

Chemical and physical data
- Formula: C_{21}H_{27}NO_{3}
- Molar mass: 341.451 g·mol^{−1}
- 3D model (JSmol): Interactive image
- SMILES: CCCN(CC)CCOC(=O)C(C1=CC=CC=C1)(C2=CC=CC=C2)O
- InChI: InChI=1S/C21H27NO3/c1-3-15-22(4-2)16-17-25-20(23)21(24,18-11-7-5-8-12-18)19-13-9-6-10-14-19/h5-14,24H,3-4,15-17H2,1-2H3; Key:PYPJRLVCFAVWFR-UHFFFAOYSA-N

Benapryzine (BAN), or benaprizine (INN), also known as benapryzine hydrochloride (USAN in the case of the hydrochloride salt and sold under the brand name Brizin, is an antiparkinsonian agent and anticholinergic which has been used in the treatment of parkinsonism. As an anticholinergic, it is specifically a muscarinic acetylcholine receptor antagonist. Structurally, benapryzine is a benzilate, and is closely related to other antimuscarinic benzilate derivatives like benactyzine. The drug was first described in the literature by 1973.
