= Brecanavir =

Chemical compound

Clinical data
- ATC code: none

Identifiers
- IUPAC name: [(3R,3aS,6aR)-2,3,3a,4,5,6a-Hexahydrofuro[5,4-b]furan-3-yl] N-[(2S,3R)-4-(1,3-benzodioxol-5-ylsulfonyl-(2-methylpropyl)amino)-3-hydroxy-1-[4-[(2-methyl-1,3-thiazol-4-yl)methoxy]phenyl]butan-2-yl]carbamate
- CAS Number: 313682-08-5
- PubChem CID: 5743186
- ChemSpider: 4675192
- UNII: E367I8C7FI
- ChEMBL: ChEMBL206031
- CompTox Dashboard (EPA): DTXSID10185296

Chemical and physical data
- Formula: C_{33}H_{41}N_{3}O_{10}S_{2}
- Molar mass: 703.82 g·mol^{−1}
- 3D model (JSmol): Interactive image
- SMILES: O=S(=O)(c2ccc1OCOc1c2)N(CC(C)C)C[C@@H](O)[C@@H](NC(=O)O[C@@H]3[C@@H]4CCO[C@@H]4OC3)Cc6ccc(OCc5nc(sc5)C)cc6
- InChI: InChI=1S/C33H41N3O10S2/c1-20(2)14-36(48(39,40)25-8-9-29-30(13-25)45-19-44-29)15-28(37)27(35-33(38)46-31-17-43-32-26(31)10-11-41-32)12-22-4-6-24(7-5-22)42-16-23-18-47-21(3)34-23/h4-9,13,18,20,26-28,31-32,37H,10-12,14-17,19H2,1-3H3,(H,35,38)/t26-,27-,28+,31-,32+/m0/s1; Key:JORVRJNILJXMMG-OLNQLETPSA-N

Brecanavir (INN; codenamed GW640385) is a protease inhibitor which has been studied for the treatment of HIV.

In December 2006, its developer, GlaxoSmithKline discontinued further development because of insurmountable issues regarding formulation.

== See also ==
- Darunavir
- TMC-310911
