= Potassium chloride (medical use) =

Electrolyte replenisher used to treat hypokalemia

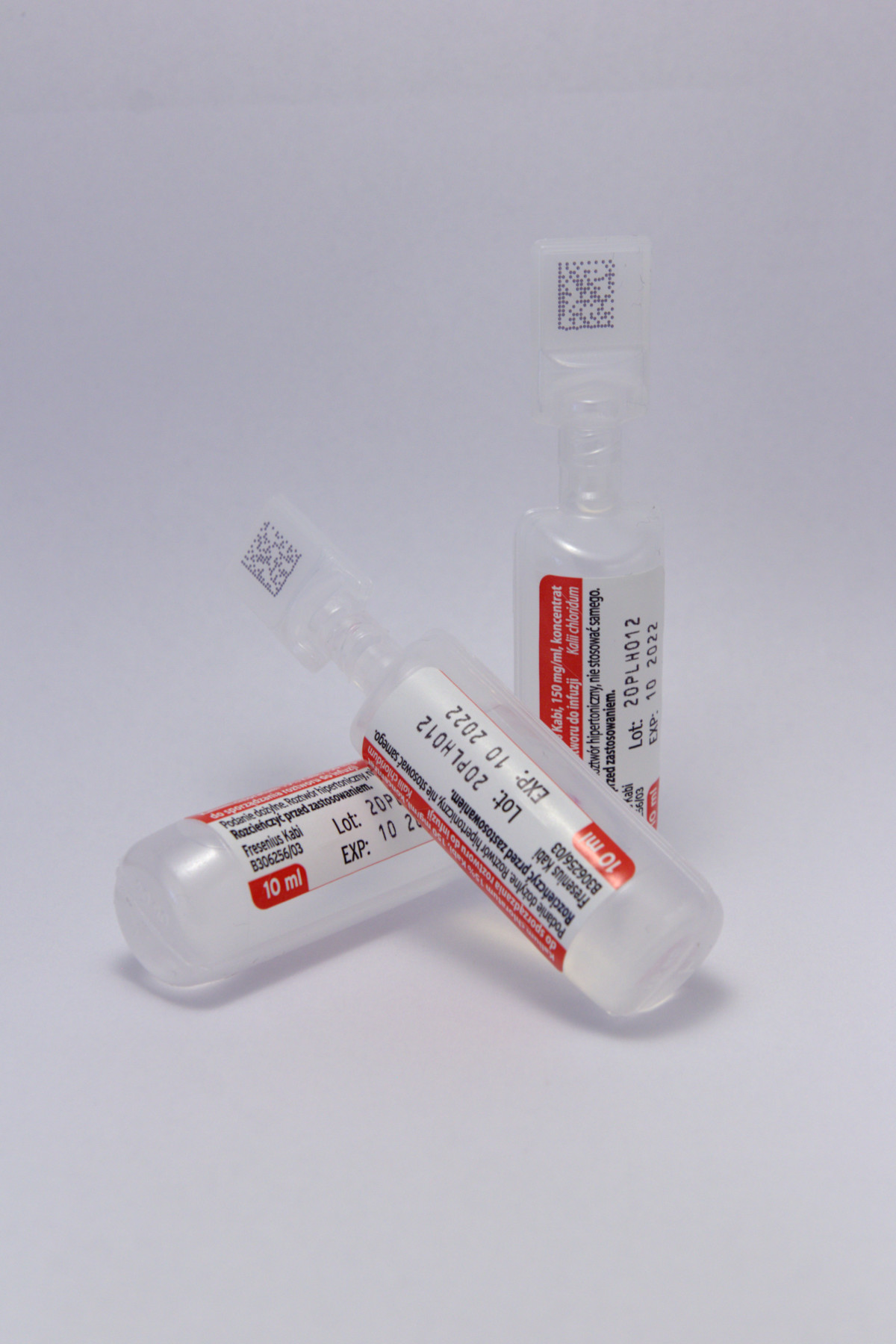

Clinical data
- Pronunciation: poe tass' i um klor' ide
- Trade names: Kay-Cee-L, Slow-K, others
- AHFS/Drugs.com: Professional Drug Facts
- License data: US DailyMed: Potassium chloride
- Routes of administration: By mouth, intravenous
- ATC code: B05XA01 (WHO) A12BA01 (WHO), A12BA51 (WHO)

Legal status
- Legal status: AU: S4 (Prescription only); US: ℞-only

Identifiers
- CAS Number: 7447-40-7
- PubChem CID: 24015
- DrugBank: DB00761
- ChemSpider: 4707
- UNII: 660YQ98I10
- KEGG: D02060
- ChEBI: CHEBI:32588
- ChEMBL: ChEMBL1200731

Chemical and physical data
- Formula: ClK
- Molar mass: 74.55 g·mol^{−1}
- 3D model (JSmol): Interactive image
- SMILES: [Cl-].[K+]
- InChI: InChI=1S/ClH.K/h1H;/q;+1/p-1; Key:WCUXLLCKKVVCTQ-UHFFFAOYSA-M

Potassium chloride, also known as potassium salt, is used as a medication to treat and prevent low blood potassium. Low blood potassium may occur due to vomiting, diarrhea, or certain medications. The concentrated version should be diluted before use. It is given by slow injection into a vein or by mouth.

Side effects may include heart problems if given too quickly by injection into a vein. By mouth it can result in abdominal pain, peptic ulcer disease, or gastrointestinal bleeding. Greater care is recommended in those with kidney problems. As long as high blood potassium does not occur, use in pregnancy or breastfeeding is believed to be safe for the baby. Generally, the strength of the formulation for injection into a vein should not be greater than 40 mmol/L (3 mg/L).

Potassium chloride came into large scale commercial use as a fertilizer in 1861 and has been used medically since the 1950s. It is on the World Health Organization's List of Essential Medicines. Potassium chloride is available as a generic medication. In 2023, it was the 44th most commonly prescribed medication in the United States, with more than 14 million prescriptions.

== Medical uses ==
Potassium chloride is used in the treatment of hypokalemia as an electrolyte replenisher.

Potassium chloride contains 52% of elemental potassium by mass.

== Side effects ==
Side effects can include gastrointestinal discomfort, including nausea and vomiting, diarrhea, and bleeding of the digestive tract.

Overdoses cause hyperkalemia, which can lead to paresthesia, cardiac conduction blocks, fibrillation, arrhythmias, and sclerosis.

Because of the risk of small-bowel lesions, the US Food and Drug Administration (FDA) requires some potassium salts containing more than 99 mg (about 1.3 mEq) to be labeled with a warning, while recommending an adult daily intake of 4700 mg (about 63 mEq).

== History ==
Slow-K is a 1950s development where the medicine is formulated to enter the bloodstream at delayed intervals. It was first only prescribed to British military forces to balance their diets while serving in Korea.

== Society and culture ==
=== Brand names ===
Brand names include K-Dur, Klor-Con, Micro-K, Slow-K, Sando-K, and Kaon Cl.

=== Lethal injection ===
Potassium chloride is used in lethal injection as the third of a three-drug combination. KCl is also sometimes used in fetal intracardiac injections in second- and third-trimester induced abortions. Jack Kevorkian's thanatron machine injected a lethal dose of potassium chloride into the patient, which caused the heart to stop functioning, after a sodium thiopental-induced coma was achieved.

Cardiac arrest induced by potassium has been used in political assassinations in Iran, by injection or by inserting a potassium suppository into the victim's rectum.
