= Balapiravir =

Chemical compound

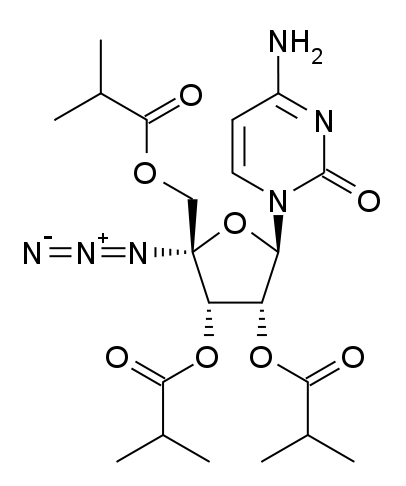

Legal status
- Legal status: US: Investigational New Drug

Identifiers
- IUPAC name: [(2R,3S,4R,5R)-5-(4-amino-2-oxopyrimidin-1-yl)-2-azido-3,4-bis(2-methylpropanoyloxy)oxolan-2-yl]methyl 2-methylpropanoate
- CAS Number: 690270-29-2
- PubChem CID: 11691726
- ChemSpider: 9866453
- UNII: VOT0LP7I9K
- KEGG: D09582
- ChEMBL: ChEMBL550936
- CompTox Dashboard (EPA): DTXSID40219098

Chemical and physical data
- Formula: C_{21}H_{30}N_{6}O_{8}
- Molar mass: 494.505 g·mol^{−1}
- 3D model (JSmol): Interactive image
- SMILES: O=c1nc(N)ccn1C2OC(N=[N+]=[N-])(COC(=O)C(C)C)C(OC(=O)C(C)C)C2OC(=O)C(C)C
- InChI: InChI=1S/C21H30N6O8/c1-10(2)17(28)32-9-21(25-26-23)15(34-19(30)12(5)6)14(33-18(29)11(3)4)16(35-21)27-8-7-13(22)24-20(27)31/h7-8,10-12,14-16H,9H2,1-6H3,(H2,22,24,31)/t14-,15+,16-,21-/m1/s1; Key:VKXWOLCNTHXCLF-DXEZIKHYSA-N

Balapiravir (R-1626, Ro4588161) is an experimental antiviral drug which acts as a polymerase inhibitor. There were efforts to develop it as a potential treatment for hepatitis C, and it was subsequently also studied in Dengue fever, but was not found to be useful. Lower doses failed to produce measurable reductions in viral load, while higher doses produced serious side effects such as lymphopenia which precluded further development of the drug. Subsequent research found that excess cytokine production triggered by Dengue virus infection prevented the conversion of the balapiravir prodrug to its active form, thereby blocking the activity of the drug.
