= Bropirimine =

Chemical compound

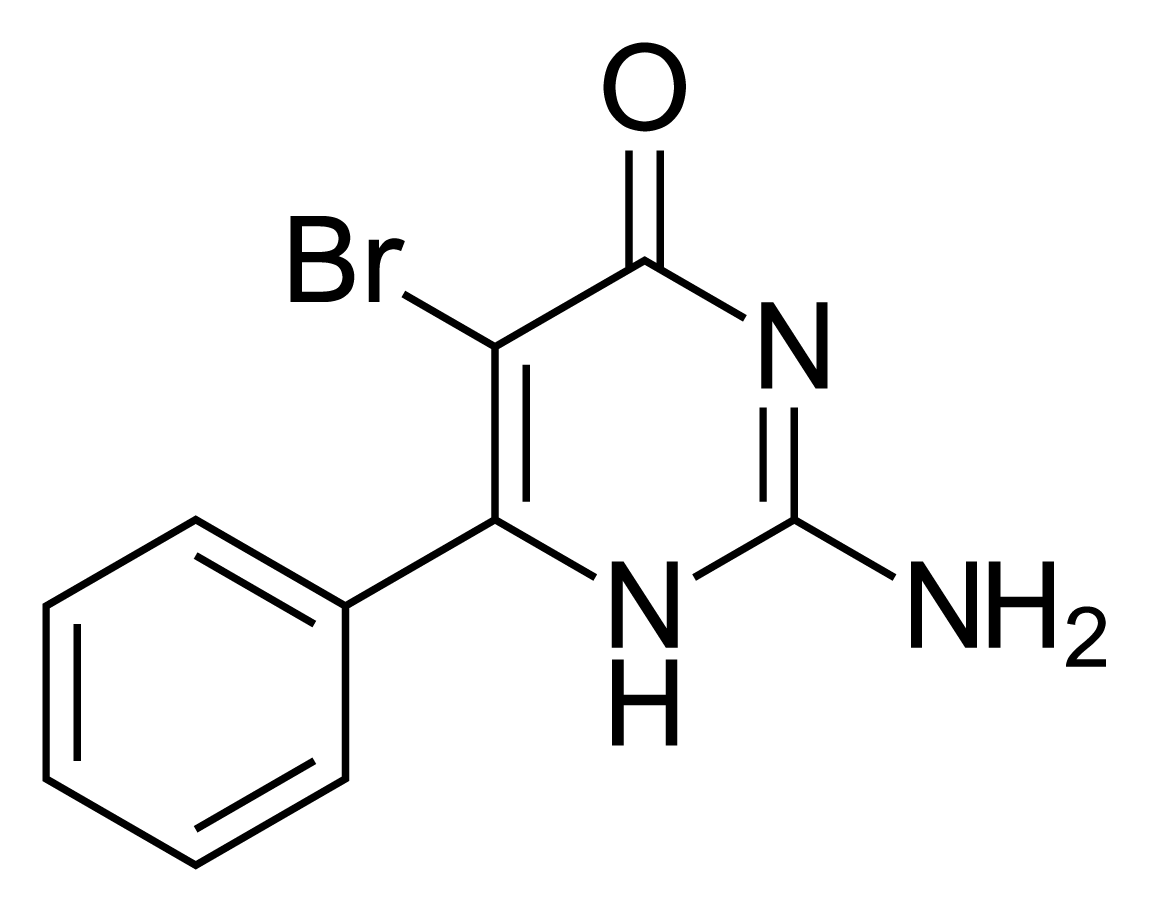

Clinical data
- ATC code: none

Identifiers
- IUPAC name: 2-amino-5-bromo-6-phenylpyrimidin-4(1H)-one
- CAS Number: 56741-95-8
- ChemSpider: 58914
- UNII: J57CTF25XJ
- ChEMBL: ChEMBL37387
- CompTox Dashboard (EPA): DTXSID5046803
- ECHA InfoCard: 100.231.001

Chemical and physical data
- Formula: C_{10}H_{8}BrN_{3}O
- Molar mass: 266.098 g·mol^{−1}
- 3D model (JSmol): Interactive image
- SMILES: Br\C2=C(/c1ccccc1)N\C(=N/C2=O)N
- InChI: InChI=1S/C10H8BrN3O/c11-7-8(6-4-2-1-3-5-6)13-10(12)14-9(7)15/h1-5H,(H3,12,13,14,15); Key:CIUUIPMOFZIWIZ-UHFFFAOYSA-N

Bropirimine is an experimental drug with anti-cancer and antiviral properties. It is an orally effective immunomodulator and is being tried in bladder cancers.

== Synthesis ==
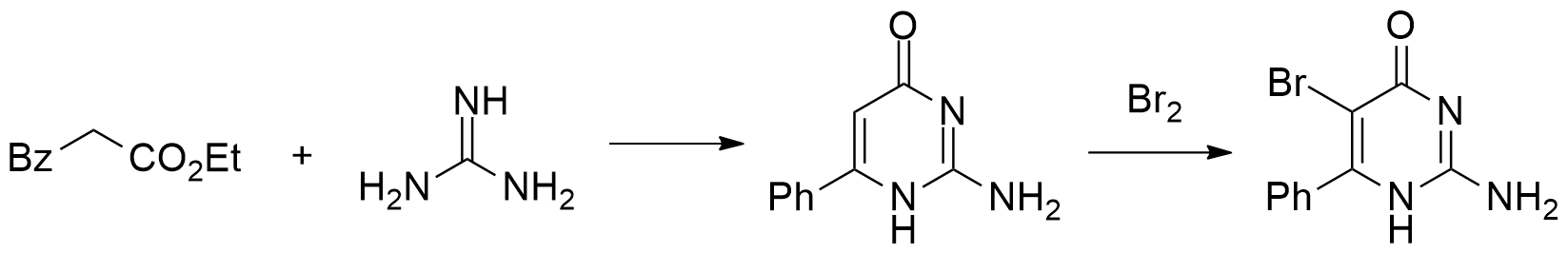
Bropirimine synthesis: other syntheses:

For the first step, the dianion from malonic acid half-ester is formed by treatment with butyllithium. Acylation of the anion with benzoyl chloride proceeds at the carbanion, which is more nucleophilic (because of the higher charge density). This tricarbonyl compound decarboxylates on acidification to the β-ketoester. Condensation with guanidine leads to the pyrimidone. NBS mediated bromination then gives bropirimine.
