= Biclotymol =

Chemical compound

Clinical data
- AHFS/Drugs.com: International Drug Names
- ATC code: none

Identifiers
- IUPAC name: 2,2′-methanediylbis[4-chloro-3-methyl-6-(propan-2-yl)phenol]
- CAS Number: 15686-33-6
- PubChem CID: 71878
- ChemSpider: 64894
- UNII: W4K0AE8XW9
- KEGG: D07527
- ChEMBL: ChEMBL2107655
- CompTox Dashboard (EPA): DTXSID90166144
- ECHA InfoCard: 100.036.140

Chemical and physical data
- Formula: C_{21}H_{26}Cl_{2}O_{2}
- Molar mass: 381.34 g·mol^{−1}
- 3D model (JSmol): Interactive image
- SMILES: Clc1cc(c(O)c(c1C)Cc2c(c(Cl)cc(c2O)C(C)C)C)C(C)C
- InChI: InChI=1S/C21H26Cl2O2/c1-10(2)14-8-18(22)12(5)16(20(14)24)7-17-13(6)19(23)9-15(11(3)4)21(17)25/h8-11,24-25H,7H2,1-6H3; Key:HNOOXWDWUSLXOB-UHFFFAOYSA-N

Biclotymol is a phenolic antiseptic that is used for mouth and throat infections. It is also used in cough medicines.
