= Erythromycin/benzoyl peroxide =

Combination drug

Combination of
- Erythromycin: Antibiotic
- Benzoyl peroxide: Antiseptic

Clinical data
- Trade names: Benzamycin
- AHFS/Drugs.com: Multum Consumer Information
- MedlinePlus: a603024
- License data: US DailyMed: Erythromycin and benzoyl peroxide
- Routes of administration: Topical

Legal status
- Legal status: US: ℞-only

Erythromycin/benzoyl peroxide, sold under the brand name Benzamycin, is a topical gel containing 5% benzoyl peroxide and 3% erythromycin primarily used to treat acne. Erythromycin/benzoyl peroxide is a prescription medication.

Side effects include dry skin, stinging, redness, and itchy rash (urticaria), with recommended usage is 2 times per day, once in the morning and once in the evening, or as prescribed by a doctor. The affected area should be washed with soap and warm water, rinsed, and gently dried before applying the gel. Using an oil-free face moisturizer in conjunction with erythromycin/benzoyl peroxide is recommended.

Erythromycin/benzoyl peroxide was approved by the US Food and Drug Administration in 1984. On March 30, 2004, a generic form of Benzamycin was released by pharmaceutical company Atrix Laboratories.
