= Brazergoline =

Clinical data
- Other names: Luvion; 2-Bromo-6-methylergoline-8β-methanol hexahydro-1H-azepine-1-carboxylate
- Drug class: Sympatholytic; Antihypertensive; Vasodilator
- ATC code: None

Identifiers
- IUPAC name: [(6aR,9R,10aR)-5-bromo-7-methyl-6,6a,8,9,10,10a-hexahydro-4H-indolo[4,3-fg]quinolin-9-yl]methyl azepane-1-carboxylate
- CAS Number: 60019-20-7
- PubChem CID: 10095768
- DrugBank: DB20548
- ChemSpider: 8271303
- UNII: C9734VZR4O
- ChEMBL: ChEMBL2106110
- CompTox Dashboard (EPA): DTXSID401024239

Chemical and physical data
- Formula: C_{23}H_{30}BrN_{3}O_{2}
- Molar mass: 460.416 g·mol^{−1}
- 3D model (JSmol): Interactive image
- SMILES: CN1C[C@@H](C[C@H]2[C@H]1CC3=C(NC4=CC=CC2=C34)Br)COC(=O)N5CCCCCC5
- InChI: InChI=1S/C23H30BrN3O2/c1-26-13-15(14-29-23(28)27-9-4-2-3-5-10-27)11-17-16-7-6-8-19-21(16)18(12-20(17)26)22(24)25-19/h6-8,15,17,20,25H,2-5,9-14H2,1H3/t15-,17-,20-/m1/s1; Key:MMPCMJGFURZYOY-WRWLIDTKSA-N

Brazergoline (INN; synonym Luvion) is a drug described as a sympatholytic, antihypertensive, and vasodilator of the ergoline family which was never marketed. It was reportedly investigated as a component of a condom with penile erection-promoting effects and as a potential treatment for female sexual dysfunction. The drug was first described in the literature by 1976.

== See also ==
- Substituted ergoline
