= Besifovir =

Chemical compound

Clinical data
- Routes of administration: Oral
- ATC code

Identifiers
- IUPAC name: [({1-[(2-Amino-9H-purin-9-yl)methyl]cyclopropyl}oxy)methyl]phosphonic acid
- CAS Number: 441785-25-7
- PubChem CID: 5270766
- ChemSpider: 4435660
- UNII: 4PLG22CQUU
- CompTox Dashboard (EPA): DTXSID601027760

Chemical and physical data
- Formula: C_{10}H_{14}N_{5}O_{4}P
- Molar mass: 299.227 g·mol^{−1}
- 3D model (JSmol): Interactive image
- SMILES: NC1=NC=C2N=CN(CC3(OCP(O)(O)=O)CC3)C2=N1
- InChI: InChI=InChI=1S/C10H14N5O4P/c11-9-12-3-7-8(14-9)15(5-13-7)4-10(1-2-10)19-6-20(16,17)18/h3,5H,1-2,4,6H2,(H2,11,12,14)(H2,16,17,18); Key:KDNSSKPZBDNJDF-UHFFFAOYSA-N

Besifovir (INN) is an investigational medication to treat hepatitis B virus (HBV) infection. It is a novel and potent acyclic nucleotide phosphonate with a similar chemical structure to adefovir and tenofovir.
