= Indium (111In) biciromab =

Indium (^{111}In) biciromab
Monoclonal antibody
- Type: Fab' fragment
- Source: Mouse
- Target: Fibrin II, beta chain

Clinical data
- Trade names: FibriScint
- Pregnancy category: N/A
- ATC code: none

Legal status
- Legal status: Withdrawn

Identifiers
- CAS Number: 138783-13-8
- ChemSpider: none
- KEGG: D03111

Indium (^{111}In) biciromab (INN, trade name FibriScint, developed by Centocor) was a drug targeting fibrin, a protein involved in the clotting of blood. It was the Fab' fragment of a mouse monoclonal antibody labelled with the radioisotope indium-111 for the diagnosis of thromboembolism, but was withdrawn during clinical trials.
