= Bectumomab =

Chemical compound

Monoclonal antibody
- Type: Fab' fragment
- Source: Mouse
- Target: CD22

Clinical data
- Trade names: LymphoScan
- ATC code: none

Identifiers
- CAS Number: 158318-63-9
- ChemSpider: none

Bectumomab (marketed under the trade name LymphoScan) is a mouse monoclonal antibody labelled with the radioactive isotope technetium-99m. It is used to detect non-Hodgkin's lymphoma.
