= Benzobarbital =

Chemical compound

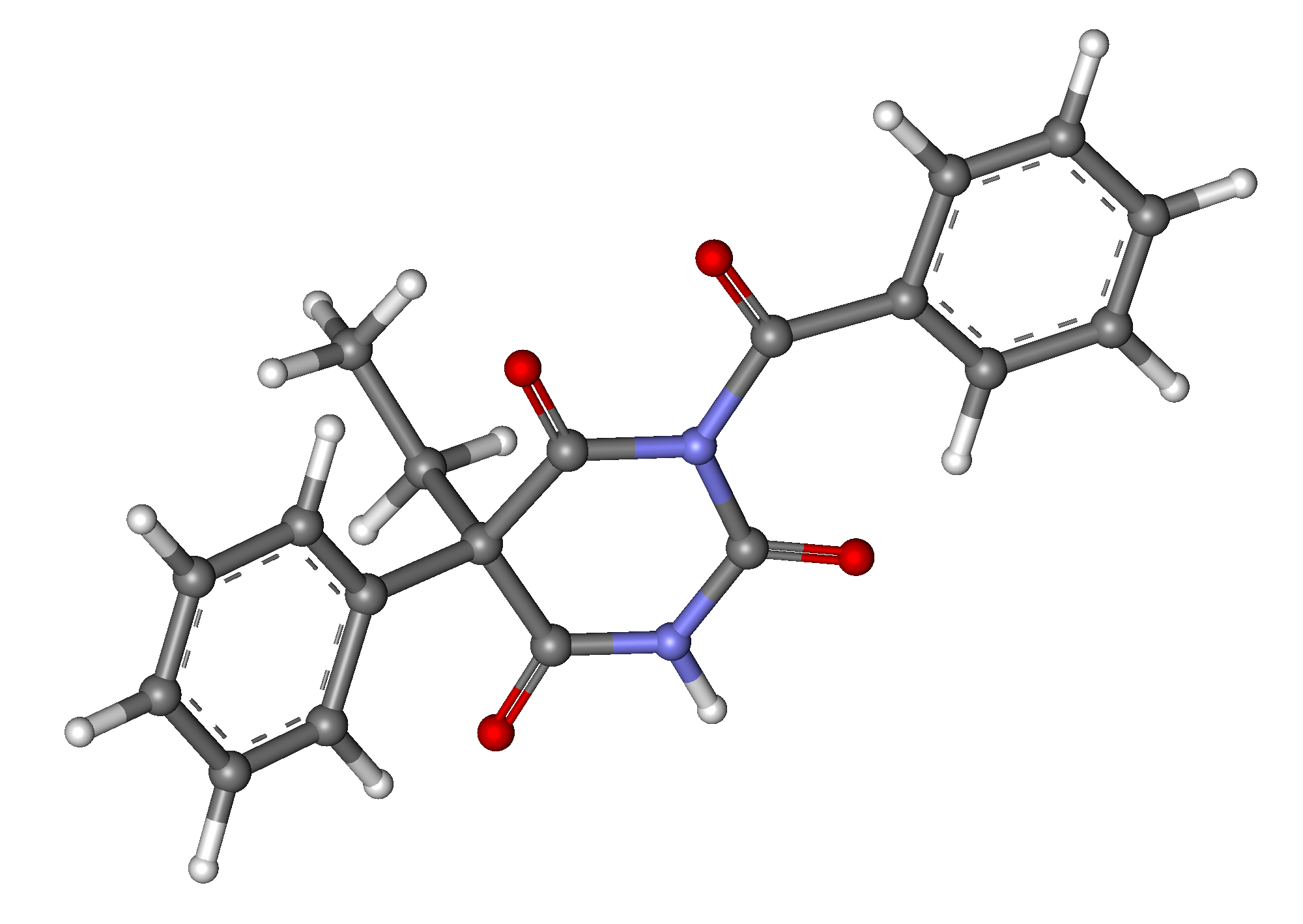

Clinical data
- Other names: Benzonal
- ATC code: none

Identifiers
- IUPAC name: 1-benzoyl-5-ethyl-5-phenyl-1,3-diazinane-2,4,6-trione
- CAS Number: 744-80-9
- PubChem CID: 12938
- ChemSpider: 12402
- UNII: YNJ78BD0AH
- ChEMBL: ChEMBL1338506
- CompTox Dashboard (EPA): DTXSID1046138

Chemical and physical data
- Formula: C_{19}H_{16}N_{2}O_{4}
- Molar mass: 336.347 g·mol^{−1}
- 3D model (JSmol): Interactive image
- SMILES: CCC1(C(=O)NC(=O)N(C1=O)C(=O)C2=CC=CC=C2)C3=CC=CC=C3
- InChI: InChI=1S/C19H16N2O4/c1-2-19(14-11-7-4-8-12-14)16(23)20-18(25)21(17(19)24)15(22)13-9-5-3-6-10-13/h3-12H,2H2,1H3,(H,20,23,25); Key:QMOWPJIFTHVQMB-UHFFFAOYSA-N

Benzobarbital (Benzonal IC) is a barbiturate derivative used in Ukraine, Georgia, ad Eastern Europe as an anticonvulsant medication and has been used for the treatment of epilepsy. It has similar liver enzyme inducing effects to the related compound, phenobarbital, which may be exploited in some clinical applications.

The World Health Organization states that there is no evidence of widespread misuse and actively opposed/recommended against worldwide controls and regulations.
