= Kuvan =

Dry riverbed in Central Asia

Kuvan or Kuvan Darya is a dry riverbed of what once was a tributary of the Syr river in Central Asia. The area is located west of Kzyl-Orda. It is an area of archaeological interest and was once home to tigers whose range extensed to the reedy shores of the Aral Sea. The area includes unusual kurgan burial sites. In the late 19th century there was some flow along the tributary before it petered out in marshlands.
