= TMC-647055 =

Chemical compound

Legal status
- Legal status: US: Investigational drug

Identifiers
- IUPAC name: 28-cyclohexyl-22-methoxy-10,16-dimethyl-9,9-dioxo-13-oxa-9λ^{6}-thia-1,8,10,16-tetrazapentacyclo[16.8.1.1^{2,6}.1^{3,26}.0^{20,25}]nonacosa-2,4,6(29),18,20(25),21,23,26(28)-octaene-7,17-dione
- CAS Number: 1204416-97-6
- PubChem CID: 44556044
- DrugBank: DB11822
- ChemSpider: 28522119
- UNII: 11BD024G7J
- ChEMBL: ChEMBL2043025
- CompTox Dashboard (EPA): DTXSID90152860

Chemical and physical data
- Formula: C_{32}H_{38}N_{4}O_{6}S
- Molar mass: 606.74 g·mol^{−1}
- 3D model (JSmol): Interactive image
- SMILES: CN1CCOCCN(S(=O)(=O)NC(=O)C2=CC3=C(C=C2)C(=C4N3CC(=CC5=C4C=CC(=C5)OC)C1=O)C6CCCCC6)C
- InChI: InChI=1S/C32H38N4O6S/c1-34-13-15-42-16-14-35(2)43(39,40)33-31(37)22-9-11-27-28(19-22)36-20-24(32(34)38)17-23-18-25(41-3)10-12-26(23)30(36)29(27)21-7-5-4-6-8-21/h9-12,17-19,21H,4-8,13-16,20H2,1-3H3,(H,33,37); Key:UOBYJVFBFSLCTQ-UHFFFAOYSA-N

TMC-647055 is an experimental antiviral drug which was developed as a treatment for hepatitis C, and is in clinical trials as a combination treatment with ribavirin and simeprevir. It acts as a NS5b polymerase inhibitor.
