= Botulin E (Clostridium botulinum strain E3) =

Medication

Clinical data
- Other names: TrenibotulinumtoxinE, TrenibotulinumtoxinE (USAN US)
- Routes of administration: Intramuscular
- Drug class: Muscle relaxant
- ATC code: None

Legal status
- Legal status: CA: ℞-only; US: Rx-only; EU:

Identifiers
- CAS Number: 1350492-91-9
- UNII: GXU2PQ2CNP

Chemical and physical data
- Formula: C_{6452}H_{9998}N_{1702}O_{1973}S_{23}
- Molar mass: 143716.28 g·mol^{−1}

Botulin E (Clostridium botulinum strain E3), sold under the brand name Boey, is a medication used for the treatment of appearance of glabellar lines. Botulin E is a botulinum neurotoxin serotype E.

The most common side effects include eyelid ptosis, brow ptosis and Mephisto sign (lateral elevation of eyebrow).

TrenibotulinumtoxinE is produced by the bacterium Clostridium botulinum and blocks the release of acetylcholine in the neuromuscular synapses, preventing the contraction of muscle cells.

== Medical uses ==
TrenibotulinumtoxinE is indicated for the temporary improvement in the appearance of moderate to severe lines between the eyebrows seen at maximum frown (glabellar lines), when these have an important psychological impact in adults.

== Society and culture ==
=== Legal status ===
A biologics license application was submitted to the US Food and Drug Administration in April 2025.

In May 2026, the Committee for Medicinal Products for Human Use of the European Medicines Agency adopted a positive opinion, recommending the granting of a marketing authorization for the medicinal product Boey, intended for the temporary improvement in the appearance of lines between the eyebrows when frowning, when these lines have an important psychological impact in adults. The applicant for this medicinal product is AbbVie Limited. trenibotulinumtoxinE was authorized for medical use in the European Union in July 2026.
