= Levobetaxolol =

Chemical compound

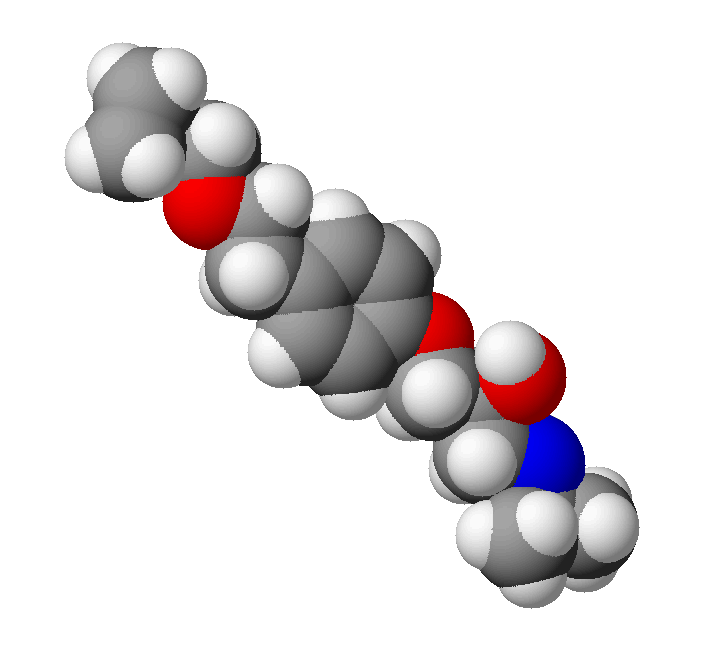

Clinical data
- Trade names: Betaxon
- Other names: AL-1577A
- AHFS/Drugs.com: Micromedex Detailed Consumer Information
- Routes of administration: Ophthalmic
- ATC code: None

Legal status
- Legal status: US: ℞-only

Pharmacokinetic data
- Elimination half-life: 20 hours

Identifiers
- IUPAC name: (2S)-1-[4-[2-(cyclopropylmethoxy)ethyl]phenoxy]-3-(propan)-2-ylamino)propan-2-ol
- CAS Number: 93221-48-8; 116209-55-3
- PubChem CID: 60657; 60656
- IUPHAR/BPS: 8035
- ChemSpider: 54669
- UNII: 75O9XHA4TU; 8MR4W4O06J
- ChEBI: CHEBI:59254; CHEBI:749326
- ChEMBL: ChEMBL1201274; ChEMBL1200837
- CompTox Dashboard (EPA): DTXSID30239341

Chemical and physical data
- Formula: C_{18}H_{29}NO_{3}
- Molar mass: 307.434 g·mol^{−1}
- 3D model (JSmol): Interactive image
- SMILES: O(C[C@H](CNC(C)C)O)C1=CC=C(CCOCC2CC2)C=C1
- InChI: InChI=1S/C18H29NO3/c1-14(2)19-11-17(20)13-22-18-7-5-15(6-8-18)9-10-21-12-16-3-4-16/h5-8,14,16-17,19-20H,3-4,9-13H2,1-2H3/t17-/m0/s1; Key:NWIUTZDMDHAVTP-KRWDZBQOSA-N; Key:CHDPSNLJFOQTRK-LMOVPXPDSA-N

Levobetaxolol, sold under the brand name Betaxon, is a medication used to lower the pressure in the eye in treating conditions such as glaucoma. It is used as the salt levobetaxolol hydrochloride. Levobetaxolol is a beta-adrenergic receptor inhibitor (beta blocker).

== Medical uses ==
Levobetaxolol is indicated for lowering intraocular pressure in people with chronic open-angle glaucoma or ocular hypertension.

== Contraindications ==
Levobetaxolol is contraindicated in people with sinus bradycardia, atrioventricular block, cardiogenic shock, or overt cardiac failure.

== History ==
Levobetaxolol was developed in the 1980s. It was approved by the US Food and Drug Administration in 2000.
