= Baxdrostat =

Chemical compound

- Molecular structure of baxdrostat

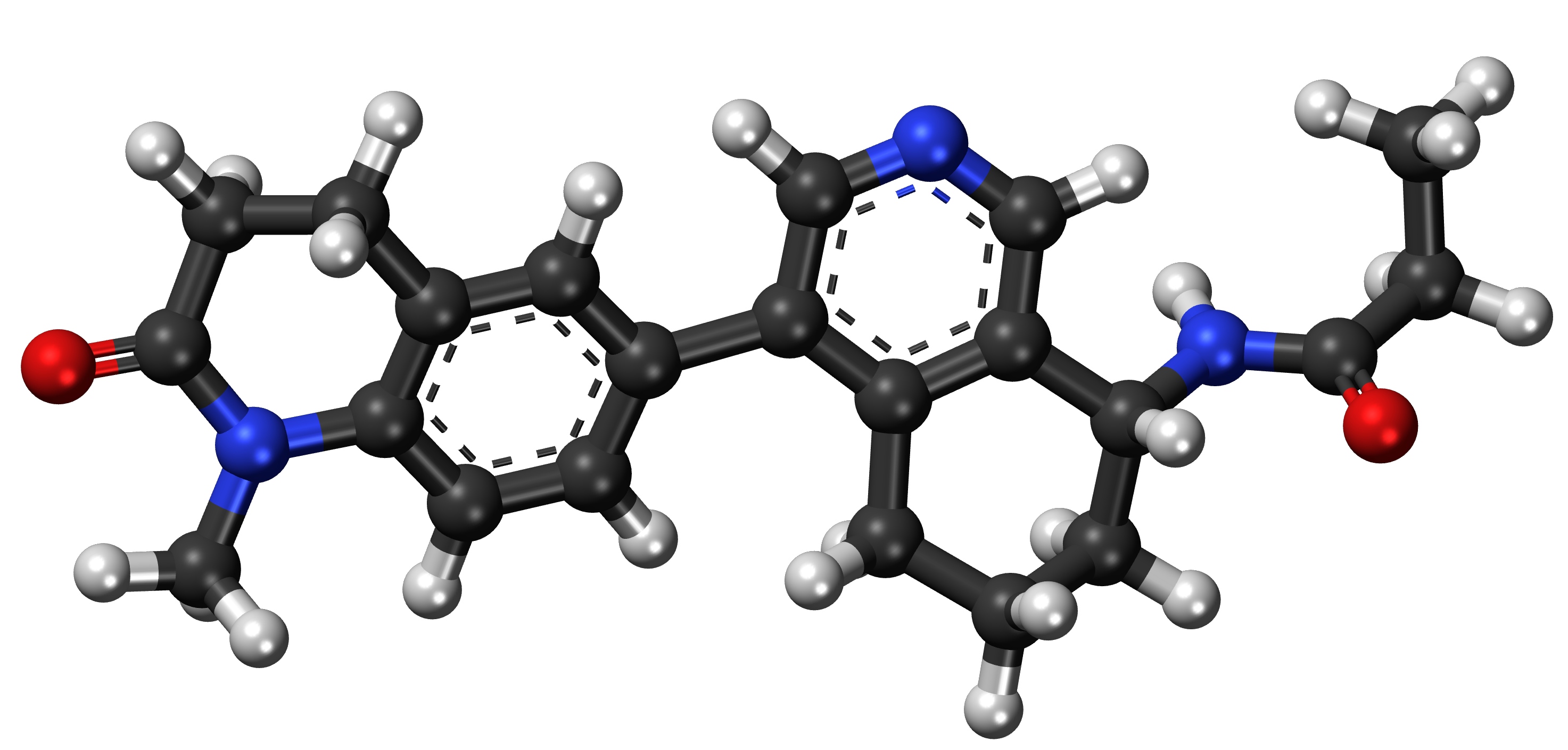
- 3D representation of a baxdrostat molecule

Clinical data
- Trade names: Baxfendy
- Other names: RO-6836191
- AHFS/Drugs.com: Monograph
- MedlinePlus: a626070
- License data: US DailyMed: Baxdrostat
- Routes of administration: By mouth
- ATC code: C02KN02 (WHO)

Legal status
- Legal status: US: ℞-only

Identifiers
- IUPAC name: N-[(8R)-4-(1-methyl-2-oxo-1,2,3,4-tetrahydro-6-quinolinyl)-5,6,7,8-tetrahydro-8-isoquinolinyl]propanamide
- CAS Number: 1428652-17-8
- PubChem CID: 71535962
- IUPHAR/BPS: 12362
- ChemSpider: 76804781
- UNII: NF3P9Z8J5Y
- KEGG: D12789
- ChEMBL: ChEMBL4113975

Chemical and physical data
- Formula: C_{22}H_{25}N_{3}O_{2}
- Molar mass: 363.461 g·mol^{−1}
- 3D model (JSmol): Interactive image
- SMILES: CCC(=O)N[C@@H]1CCCC2=C(C=NC=C12)C3=CC=C4N(C)C(=O)CCC4=C3
- InChI: InChI=1S/C22H25N3O2/c1-3-21(26)24-19-6-4-5-16-17(12-23-13-18(16)19)14-7-9-20-15(11-14)8-10-22(27)25(20)2/h7,9,11-13,19H,3-6,8,10H2,1-2H3,(H,24,26)/t19-/m1/s1; Key:VDEUDSRUMNAXJG-LJQANCHMSA-N

Baxdrostat, sold under the brand name Baxfendy, is a medication used for the treatment of hypertension (high blood pressure). It is an aldosterone synthase inhibitor. It is taken by mouth.

Baxdrostat was approved for medical use in the United States in May 2026.

== Medical uses ==
Baxdrostat is indicated for the treatment of hypertension in combination with other antihypertensive drugs, to lower blood pressure in adults who are not adequately controlled on other agents.

== Mechanism of action ==
Aldosterone dysregulation contributes significantly to the pathogenesis of resistant hypertension. While conventional drugs act by blocking the mineralocorticoid receptor, baxdrostat, an aldosterone synthase inhibitor, targets the aldosterone synthesis directly.

== History ==
=== Clinical trials ===
==== BrigHTN ====
In adults with treatment-resistant hypertension, treatment with baxdrostat at doses of 1 mg or 2 mg daily produced significantly greater reductions in systolic blood pressure over 12 weeks compared to placebo.

==== BaxHTN ====
BaxHTN is a phase III trial. It found that adding once-daily baxdrostat to standard antihypertensive therapy led to significantly greater reductions in seated systolic blood pressure at 12 weeks compared with placebo, in adults with uncontrolled or resistant hypertension.

Bax24

Treatment with a once-daily 2mg dose of baxdrostat resulted in a clinically significant reduction in ambulatory systolic blood pressure reading over 12 weeks compared to placebo. A side effect of hyperkalaemia was noted.

== Society and culture ==
=== Legal status ===
Baxdrostat was approved for medical use in the United States in May 2026.

=== Names ===
Baxdrostat is the international nonproprietary name.

Baxdrostat is sold under the brand name Baxfendy.
