= Benexate =

Chemical compound

Clinical data
- AHFS/Drugs.com: International Drug Names
- Routes of administration: Oral
- ATC code: none

Legal status
- Legal status: In general: ℞ (Prescription only)

Identifiers
- IUPAC name: Phenylmethyl 2-[4-[(diaminomethylideneamino)methyl]cyclohexanecarbonyl]oxybenzoate
- CAS Number: 78718-52-2
- PubChem CID: 2316
- ChemSpider: 2226
- UNII: O3PR2X907M
- ChEMBL: ChEMBLCHEMBL2104696

Chemical and physical data
- Formula: C_{23}H_{27}N_{3}O_{4}
- Molar mass: 409.486 g·mol^{−1}
- 3D model (JSmol): Interactive image
- SMILES: O=C(OCc1ccccc1)c3ccccc3OC(=O)C2CCC(C/N=C(\N)N)CC2
- InChI: InChI=1S/C23H27N3O4/c24-23(25)26-14-16-10-12-18(13-11-16)21(27)30-20-9-5-4-8-19(20)22(28)29-15-17-6-2-1-3-7-17/h1-9,16,18H,10-15H2,(H4,24,25,26); Key:IAXUQWSLRKIRFR-UHFFFAOYSA-N

Benexate (BEX) is an anti-ulcer agent used in the treatment of acid-related disorders. It is unique in its inability to form salts that are both non-bitter and soluble.

== Medical uses ==
Benexate is approved from treatment of gastric ulcer in Japan.

== Mechanism of action ==
The mechanism of action of benexate involves promotion of prostaglandin synthesis, protein secretion, and blood flow stimulation in the gastrointestinal tract.

== See also ==
- Famotidine
- Powder diffraction
- Sugar substitute
- Crystal engineering
