= Bornaprolol =

Names
- IUPAC name 1-[2-(3-Bicyclo[2.2.1]heptanyl)phenoxy]-3-(propan-2-ylamino)propan-2-ol

Identifiers
CAS Number	66451-06-7
3D model (JSmol)	Interactive image
ChEMBL	ChEMBL1742431
ChemSpider	62095
PubChem CID	68863
UNII	66STS87GEY
CompTox Dashboard (EPA)	DTXSID401024384
- InChI: InChI=1S/C19H29NO2/c1-13(2)20-11-16(21)12-22-19-6-4-3-5-17(19)18-10-14-7-8-15(18)9-14/h3-6,13-16,18,20-21H,7-12H2,1-2H3 Key: NACJSVRGPPMZRS-UHFFFAOYSA-N
- SMILES: CC(C)NCC(COC1=CC=CC=C1C2CC3CCC2C3)O

Properties
Chemical formula	C_{19}H_{29}NO_{2}
Molar mass	303.446 g·mol^{−1}
- Except where otherwise noted, data are given for materials in their standard state (at 25 °C [77 °F], 100 kPa). Infobox references

Bornaprolol is a beta-adrenergic antagonist.

== Synthesis ==
ChemDrug Synthesis: Patent:

The reaction between 2-(Bicyclo[2.2.1]hept-2-yl)phenol [17152-43-1] (1) and epichlorohydrin [106-89-8] (2) in the presence of sodium metal gives (3). Opening of the oxirane by treatment with isopropylamine [75-31-0] (4) completed the synthesis of Bornaprolol (5).
