= Brefonalol =

Names
- IUPAC name 6-[1-Hydroxy-2-[(2-methyl-4-phenylbutan-2-yl)amino]ethyl]-3,4-dihydro-1H-quinolin-2-one
- Other names Brefanolol

Identifiers
CAS Number	104051-20-9
3D model (JSmol)	Interactive image
ChEMBL	ChEMBL1742432
ChemSpider	59289
PubChem CID	65880
UNII	DVO6SSG9S3
CompTox Dashboard (EPA)	DTXSID20869414
- InChI: InChI=1S/C22H28N2O2/c1-22(2,13-12-16-6-4-3-5-7-16)23-15-20(25)18-8-10-19-17(14-18)9-11-21(26)24-19/h3-8,10,14,20,23,25H,9,11-13,15H2,1-2H3,(H,24,26) Key: YYUZPBGIBVJYSI-UHFFFAOYSA-N; InChI=1/C22H28N2O2/c1-22(2,13-12-16-6-4-3-5-7-16)23-15-20(25)18-8-10-19-17(14-18)9-11-21(26)24-19/h3-8,10,14,20,23,25H,9,11-13,15H2,1-2H3,(H,24,26) Key: YYUZPBGIBVJYSI-UHFFFAOYAN
- SMILES: CC(C)(CCC1=CC=CC=C1)NCC(C2=CC3=C(C=C2)NC(=O)CC3)O

Properties
Chemical formula	C_{22}H_{28}N_{2}O_{2}
Molar mass	352.478 g·mol^{−1}
- Except where otherwise noted, data are given for materials in their standard state (at 25 °C [77 °F], 100 kPa). Infobox references

Brefonalol is a beta-adrenergic antagonist that reduces heart frequency and blood pressure and dilates blood vessels. It has been studied in around 1990, but is not known to be marketed as of 2021.
