= Pembrolizumab/berahyaluronidase alfa =

Combination medication

Combination of
- Pembrolizumab: Programmed death receptor-1 (PD-1) blocking antibody
- Berahyaluronidase alfa: Variant of hyaluronidase

Clinical data
- Trade names: Keytruda Qlex
- License data: US DailyMed: Pembrolizumab and berahyaluronidase alfa
- Routes of administration: Subcutaneous
- ATC code: None

Legal status
- Legal status: US: ℞-only

Identifiers
- KEGG: D13168

Pembrolizumab/berahyaluronidase alfa, sold under the brand name Keytruda Qlex, is a fixed dose combination medication used for the treatment of many types of solid tumors. It contains pembrolizumab, a programmed death receptor-1 (PD-1) blocking antibody; and berahyaluronidase alfa, a variant of hyaluronidase. It is given by injection under the skin (subcutaneous).

Pembrolizumab/berahyaluronidase alfa was approved for medical use in the United States in September 2025.

== Medical uses ==
Pembrolizumab/berahyaluronidase alfa is indicated for the solid tumor indications approved for the intravenous formulation of pembrolizumab.

== Side effects ==
The US FDA prescribing information includes warnings and precautions for immune-mediated adverse reactions, hypersensitivity and administration-related reactions, complications of allogeneic hematopoietic stem cell transplantation, and embryo-fetal toxicity.

== History ==
The efficacy was evaluated in study MK-3475A-D77 (NCT05722015), a randomized, multi-center, open-label, active-controlled trial conducted in participants with treatment-naïve metastatic non-small cell lung cancer, in whom there were no EGFR, ALK, or ROS1 genomic tumor aberrations. A total of 377 participants were randomized (2:1) to receive either pembrolizumab/berahyaluronidase alfa administered subcutaneously every six weeks with platinum doublet chemotherapy or pembrolizumab administered intravenously every six weeks with platinum doublet chemotherapy.

== Society and culture ==
=== Legal status ===
Pembrolizumab/berahyaluronidase alfa was approved for medical use in the United States in September 2025.

=== Names ===
Pembrolizumab and berahyaluronidase alfa are international nonproprietary names.

Pembrolizumab/berahyaluronidase alfa is sold under the brand name Keytruda Qlex.
