= Ruth Plummer =

Professor of Experimental Cancer Medicine

Ruth Plummer MBE FMedSci
- Citizenship: United Kingdom
- Education: University of Cambridge; University of Oxford
- Known for: Early stage clinical trials, Drug development
- Awards: Fellow, Academy of Medical Sciences; Translational Cancer Research prize
- Scientific career
- Fields: melanoma, clinical trials, drug development
- Workplaces: Newcastle University; Sir Bobby Robson Cancer Trials Research Centre; Newcastle upon Tyne Hospitals NHS Foundation Trust

Elizabeth Ruth Plummer MBE FMedSci is a British oncologist and academic. She is a Professor of Experimental Cancer Medicine at Newcastle University and an oncologist specialising in treating patients with melanoma. Based in Newcastle, she directs the Sir Bobby Robson Cancer Trials Research Centre, set up by the Sir Bobby Robson Foundation to run early-stage clinical trials.v Plummer and the Newcastle team won a 2010 Translational Cancer Research Prize from Cancer Research UK for work using rucaparib to treat ovarian cancer. Plummer was elected as a fellow of the UK's Academy of Medical Sciences in 2018.

== Education and career ==
Plummer studied pre-clinical medicine at the University of Cambridge and completed a PhD and her clinical studies at the University of Oxford.

She then moved back to Newcastle, working at the Northern Institute for Cancer Research at Newcastle University. She lists her research interests as DNA repair and the early trials of new drugs.

Plummer is Professor of Experimental Cancer Medicine at the Northern Institute for Cancer Research, Newcastle University and an honorary consultant medical oncologist in Newcastle Hospital NHS Foundation Trust. She is Director of the Sir Bobby Robson Cancer Trials Research Centre within the Northern Centre for Cancer Care, w a dedicated clinical trials unit within the regional cancer centre. . Plummer also leads the Newcastle Experimental Cancer Medicine Centre and the CRUK Newcastle Cancer Centre.

== Scientific work ==
Plummer was the first clinician to write a prescription for the cancer drug Rucaparib, a PARP inhibitor in 2003. She led early clinical trials testing a combination of rucaparib (AG014699) and temozolomide in patients with advanced solid tumours, discovering that it well tolerated. She has also led early-stage trials that determined the safety of the combination of rucaparib and the chemotherapy drug carboplatin for advanced solid tumours, Following successful clinical trials, Rucaparib was given accelerated approval in the US by the FDA in 2016 and received a conditional licence by the EU in 2018.

She has also led studies bringing a new type of drug, ATR inhibitor, into the clinic through early-stage clinical trials. ATR, which stands for Ataxia telangiectasia and Rad3 related, regulates how cells respond to stress and can help promote DNA repair.

She chairs the Cancer Research UK New Agents Committee and the Scientific Advisory Board for Target Ovarian Cancer. She is a member of Cancer Research UK’s Clinical Research Committee and the Medical Research Council’s Stratified Medicines Group. She sits on the clinical advisory board for Karus Therapeutics, and is a scientific advisor for CV6 Therapeutics.

== Honours and awards ==
Plummer was elected a fellow of the Academy of Medical Sciences in 2018 ." The Academy cited that she “has a world-leading reputation in the design and delivery of early phase clinical trials. She has taken many new cancer drugs into the clinic to determine their optimal dose, which have then become standard treatments with proven patient benefit.”

She won a Translational Cancer Research Prize from Cancer Research UK for this work in 2010 for her work on PARP inhibitor trials.

Plummer was appointed Member of the Order of the British Empire (MBE) in the 2022 Birthday Honours for services to medicine.
