= Triple Negative Breast Cancer Foundation =

- Company type: Non-Profit
- Founded: 2006 in Norwood, New Jersey
- Headquarters: Norwood, United States
- Key people: Hayley Dinerman (Co-founder & Executive Director); Board of Trustees; Ann Arnold; Allison Axenrod; Melissa Berry; Drew Cawthorne; Ricki Fairley; Ogori Kalu, MD; Rita Nanda, MD; Jennifer K. Sweetwood; Bryan Tucker; Eric P. Winer, MD; Robin Woolcock; Scientific Advisory Board; Lisa A. Carey, MD, UNC Lineberger Comprehensive Cancer Center; Susan M. Domchek, MD; Lisa A. Newman, MD, Weill Cornell Medicine; George W. Sledge, Jr., MD, Stanford University Medical Center; Eric P. Winer, MD, Yale Cancer Center; Global Ambassadors; Robin Woolcock, UK Ambassador
- Website: tnbcfoundation.org

The Triple Negative Breast Cancer Foundation ("TNBC Foundation") is a nonprofit organization dedicated to raising awareness of triple negative breast cancer. The foundation supports scientists and researchers in their efforts to determine the definitive causes of triple negative breast cancer so that effective detection, diagnosis, prevention, and treatment can be pursued and achieved.

Since its inception in 2006, TNBC Foundation has raised over $15 million to further this mission.

== History ==
TNBC Foundation was founded in 2006 in honor of Nancy Block-Zenna, who, at age 35, was diagnosed with triple negative breast cancer. In response to her diagnosis, her close friends launched the TNBC Foundation to raise awareness and support research for this particular type of breast cancer. Block-Zenna died of the disease in 2007, 2 1/2 years after her diagnosis. At the time, little was known about triple negative breast cancer, and research efforts were minimal. The Foundation was created to raise awareness about TNBC, provide credible information about the disease, fund TNBC-specific research, and create a caring community of support for Thrivers and their families.

== Grants and Awards ==
TNBC Foundation helps set research agendas around the disease, ensuring that triple negative breast cancer research is never neglected. The Foundation’s research investments have had an exponential impact. An initial $1 million investment with the American Association of Cancer Research has generated $17.6 million in additional TNBC research.

In 2008, the Triple Negative Breast Cancer Foundation co-funded a research grant with the Susan G. Komen for the Cure Foundation. TNBC Foundation's initial $500,000 contribution marks the first time a nonprofit partner has co-funded one of Komen's "Promise Grants". Worth $7.5 million over five years, Promise Grants are designed to bring clinical researchers and basic scientists together to deliver new treatments for patients as quickly as possible. The Promise Grant was awarded to Dr. Andreas Forero of the University of Alabama at Birmingham Comprehensive Cancer Center. Forero and his team are researching a new targeted therapy for triple negative breast cancer.

Along with the American Association for Cancer Research, the Triple Negative Breast Cancer Foundation awarded the AACR-Triple Negative Breast Cancer Foundation Career Development Award for Clinical/Translational Research to Eddy Yang, MD, PhD in 2015. This three-year, $250,000 award contributed scientific advancements, including utilizing inhibitors of DNA repair to induce cancer vulnerability to PARP inhibitors.

In 2023, the Triple Negative Breast Cancer Foundation partnered with the ASCO Foundation to award Ana Garrido-Castro, MD, with the 2023 Conquer Cancer - Triple Negative Breast Cancer Foundation Advanced Clinical Research Award. This three-year, $450,000 grant supports mid-career physician scientists who wish to conduct original and currently unfunded research that supports the discovery of new targeted treatments for patients with triple negative breast cancer.

You can find updates on all of the TNBC Foundation’s research investments on their website.

== Global Activities ==
In 2021, TNBC Foundation Board Member Robin Woolcock started the UK Charity for Triple Negative Breast Cancer. The UK Charity for TNBC is a registered charity dedicated to helping people affected by triple negative breast cancer by providing access to easy-to-understand and reliable information. They also ensure that the voice of those with TNBC is heard and that their specific needs are recognized and addressed.

== Events ==
TNBC Foundation founded and hosts TNBC Day, the only global event dedicated to raising awareness and funding TNBC-specific research every March. In 2024 they partnered with Carrabba’s Italian Grill, where $35,000 was raised for TNBC research with Trios for a Cure.

TNBC Foundation hosts multiple events throughout the year to raise funds for TNBC-specific research, including Concert for a Cure, an event benefitting the TNBC Foundation. They also host No One Fights Alone, an annual gala and awards ceremony to honor giants in the field of TNBC research, as well as companies and individuals who have made significant impact on the TNBC community. Over the years, TNBC Foundation has raised more than $4 million through their gala to support vital research, resources, programs, and services for the TNBC community.

For their community members, the TNBC Foundation hosts monthly virtual meetups including Tuesdays with TNBC Friends, Metastatic Mondays with TNBC Friends, and Thursdays with TNBC Friends. These free online forums allow members of the TNBC community to connect, share information, exchange treatment tips, and support each other during a participant-led discussion.

== Symposium ==
On December 11, 2007, the TNBC Foundation and Susan G. Komen for the Cure convened one of the first "think tanks" dedicated specifically to triple negative breast cancer. The meeting was held prior to the opening of the annual San Antonio Breast Cancer Symposium.

Thirty researchers, from leading cancer institutions in North America and Europe, were invited to share information on the latest science, to discuss potential research collaborations and develop a scientific agenda for future research and clinical trials to find effective treatment for women with this subtype of breast cancer. The meeting also marked the first joint effort between TNBCF and Susan G. Komen for the Cure to share resources to accelerate research and progress for women who are not benefiting from recent advances in breast cancer research.

The goal of the meeting was to create the first comprehensive publication and white-paper summarizing the "state of the science" with input and authorship from leading researchers from around the world who have been dedicated specifically to this subtype of the disease. The publication will also include a roadmap and recommendations for planning, funding and designing the next level of research with the goal of identifying effective, tailored therapies for these women, thereby further reducing the rates of breast cancer mortality around the world.

Co-chairing the symposium were Allison Axenrod, executive director of TNBCF, and Hayley Dinerman, TNBCF's director of operations. The program was planned by TNBC's medical advisory board, which includes Dr. Winer as well as Lisa A. Carey, medical director of the University of North Carolina Lineberger Comprehensive Cancer Center, and George W. Sledge, Jr., professor of Medicine and Pathology and co-chair of the Breast Cancer Program at the Indiana University School of Medicine.

TNBC has convened the Symposium each year since 2007. In 2010, over 30 researchers and scientists attended the Symposium, which was again co-sponsored by Susan G. Komen for the Cure and the Breast Cancer Research Foundation (BCRF). That year, the TNBCF awarded its first independent grants to two researchers who were doing research in the area of triple negative breast cancer.
