= Pamiparib =

PARP inhibitor anti-cancer drug compound

Clinical data
- Trade names: Partruvix
- Other names: BGB-290
- ATC code: L01XK06 (WHO)

Legal status
- Legal status: US: Investigational New Drug; Rx in China

Identifiers
- IUPAC name: (2R)-14-Fluoro-2-methyl-6,9,10,19-tetrazapentacyclo[14.2.1.0^{2,6}.0^{8,18}.0^{12,17}]nonadeca-1(18),8,12(17),13,15-pentaen-11-one
- CAS Number: 1446261-44-4
- PubChem CID: 135565554
- DrugBank: DB14769
- ChemSpider: 58805610
- UNII: 8375F9S90C
- KEGG: D11426
- ChEMBL: ChEMBL4112930

Chemical and physical data
- Formula: C_{16}H_{15}FN_{4}O
- Molar mass: 298.321 g·mol^{−1}
- 3D model (JSmol): Interactive image
- SMILES: C[C@]12CCCN1CC3=NNC(=O)C4=C5C3=C2NC5=CC(=C4)F
- InChI: InChI=1S/C16H15FN4O/c1-16-3-2-4-21(16)7-11-13-12-9(15(22)20-19-11)5-8(17)6-10(12)18-14(13)16/h5-6,18H,2-4,7H2,1H3,(H,20,22)/t16-/m1/s1; Key:DENYZIUJOTUUNY-MRXNPFEDSA-N

Pamiparib, sold under the brand name Partruvix, is a pharmaceutical drug used for the treatment of various types of cancer. Pamiparib is a member of the PARP inhibitor drug class.

In China, it is approved for the treatment of germline BRCA mutation-associated recurrent advanced ovarian, fallopian tube, and primary peritoneal cancers previously treated with two or more lines of chemotherapy.

It is currently under investigation for the treatment of other forms of cancer.
