= Talazoparib =

Chemical compound

Clinical data
- Trade names: Talzenna
- Other names: BMN-673
- AHFS/Drugs.com: Monograph
- MedlinePlus: a618070
- License data: US DailyMed: Talazoparib
- Pregnancy category: AU: D
- Routes of administration: By mouth
- Drug class: PARP inhibitor
- ATC code: L01XK04 (WHO)

Legal status
- Legal status: AU: S4 (Prescription only); CA: ℞-only; UK: POM (Prescription only); US: ℞-only; EU: Rx-only; In general: ℞ (Prescription only)

Pharmacokinetic data
- Protein binding: 74%
- Metabolism: Minimal metabolisation (<30%)
- Elimination half-life: 90 (±58) hrs
- Excretion: 69% in urine, 20% in feces

Identifiers
- IUPAC name: (8S,9R)-5-Fluoro-8-(4-fluorophenyl)-9-(1-methyl-1H-1,2,4-triazol-5-yl)-2,7,8,9-tetrahydro-3H-pyrido[4,3,2-de]phthalazin-3-one
- CAS Number: 1207456-01-6
- PubChem CID: 135565082
- DrugBank: DB11760
- ChemSpider: 28637772
- UNII: 9QHX048FRV
- KEGG: D10732; as salt: D10733
- ChEMBL: ChEMBL3137320
- CompTox Dashboard (EPA): DTXSID001025928
- ECHA InfoCard: 100.249.319

Chemical and physical data
- Formula: C_{19}H_{14}F_{2}N_{6}O
- Molar mass: 380.359 g·mol^{−1}
- 3D model (JSmol): Interactive image
- SMILES: Cn1c(ncn1)[C@H]2c3c4c(cc(cc4N[C@@H]2c5ccc(cc5)F)F)c(=O)[nH]n3
- InChI: InChI=1S/C19H14F2N6O/c1-27-18(22-8-23-27)15-16(9-2-4-10(20)5-3-9)24-13-7-11(21)6-12-14(13)17(15)25-26-19(12)28/h2-8,15-16,24H,1H3,(H,26,28)/t15-,16-/m1/s1; Key:HWGQMRYQVZSGDQ-HZPDHXFCSA-N

Talazoparib, sold under the brand name Talzenna, is an anti-cancer medication used for the treatment of breast cancer and prostate cancer. It is an orally available poly ADP ribose polymerase (PARP) inhibitor marketed by Pfizer for the treatment of advanced breast cancer with germline BRCA mutations. Talazoparib is similar to the first in class PARP inhibitor, olaparib.

The most common adverse reactions of any grade were fatigue, anemia, nausea, neutropenia, headache, thrombocytopenia, vomiting, alopecia, diarrhea, decreased appetite.

It was approved in October 2018, in the United States and June 2019, in the European Union for germline BRCA-mutated, HER2-negative locally advanced or metastatic breast cancer. In January 2024, the European Commission approved talazoparib in combination with enzalutamide for the treatment of metastatic castration-resistant prostate cancer (mCRPC) in adults.

== Medical uses ==
Talazoparib is indicated for the treatment of breast cancer and prostate cancer. It is indicated for the treatment of people with deleterious or suspected deleterious germline BRCA-mutated (gBRCAm), HER2‑negative locally advanced or metastatic breast cancer; and, in combination with enzalutamide, for homologous recombination repair (HRR) gene-mutated metastatic castration-resistant prostate cancer (mCRPC).

== Side effects ==
The most serious side effects in studies were related to the blood forming system and included anaemia (low red blood cell count), neutropenia (low neutrophil blood cell count) and thrombocytopenia (low platelet count). Serious forms of these conditions (grade 3 to 4) occurred in 39%, 21% and 15% of patients, respectively. Other adverse effects such as headache, nausea, hair loss and fatigue were mostly mild.

The FDA label includes warnings and precautions for myelodysplastic syndrome/acute myeloid leukemia, myelosuppression, and embryo-fetal toxicity.

== Interactions ==
Combination with drugs that inhibit P-glycoprotein or BCRP may increase talazoparib concentrations in the body.

== Mechanism of action ==
Talazoparib acts as an inhibitor of poly ADP ribose polymerase (PARP) which aids in single strand DNA repair. Cells that have BRCA1/2 mutations are susceptible to the cytotoxic effects of PARP inhibitors because of an accumulation of DNA damage. Talazoparib is theorized to have a higher potency than olaparib due to the additional mechanism of action called PARP trapping. PARP trapping is the mechanism of action where the PARP molecule is trapped on the DNA, which interferes with the cells ability to replicate. Talazoparib is found to be ~100 fold more efficient in PARP trapping than olaparib. However, this increased potency may not translate directly to clinical effectiveness as many other factors must be considered.

== History ==
The approval by the US Food and Drug Administration (FDA) for treating breast cancer was based on EMBRACA (NCT01945775), an open‑label trial randomizing 431 participants (2:1) with gBRCAm HER2‑negative locally advanced or metastatic breast cancer to receive talazoparib (1 mg) or physician's choice of chemotherapy (capecitabine, eribulin, gemcitabine, or vinorelbine). All participants were required to have a known deleterious or suspected deleterious gBRCA mutation and must have received no more than three prior cytotoxic chemotherapy regimens for locally advanced or metastatic disease. Participants were required to have received treatment with an anthracycline and/or a taxane (unless contraindicated) in the neoadjuvant, adjuvant, and/or metastatic treatment setting. The trial was conducted at 145 sites in the US, Europe, Brazil, South Korea, Taiwan, Israel, and Australia.

The efficacy of talazoparib used to treat prostate cancer was evaluated in TALAPRO-2 (NCT03395197), a randomized, double-blind, placebo-controlled, multi-cohort trial enrolling 399 participants with HRR gene-mutated mCRPC. Participants were randomized (1:1) to receive enzalutamide 160 mg daily plus either talazoparib 0.5 mg or placebo daily. Participants were required to have a prior orchiectomy and, if not performed, received gonadotropin-releasing hormone (GnRH) analogs. Participants with prior systemic therapy for mCRPC were excluded; however, prior CYP17 inhibitors or docetaxel for metastatic castration-sensitive prostate cancer (mCSPC) was permitted. Randomization was stratified by previous treatment with a CYP17 inhibitor or docetaxel. HRR genes (ATM, ATR, BRCA1, BRCA2, CDK12, CHEK2, FANCA, MLH1, MRE11A, NBN, PALB2, or RAD51C) were assessed prospectively using tumor tissue and/or circulating tumor DNA (ctDNA)-based next generation sequencing assays.

== Society and culture ==
=== Economics ===
Talazoparib was developed by BioMarin Pharmaceutical Inc. and Medivation Inc. acquired all worldwide rights to talazoparib in August 2015. Medivation acquired talazoparib for $410 million with additional payments of up to $160 million in royalties and milestones. Pfizer acquired Medivation in 2016.
