= Veliparib =

Chemical compound

Clinical data
- ATC code: L01XK05 (WHO)

Identifiers
- IUPAC name: 2-((R)-2-Methylpyrrolidin-2-yl)-1H-benzimidazole-4-carboxamide
- CAS Number: 912444-00-9
- PubChem CID: 11960529
- IUPHAR/BPS: 7417
- DrugBank: DB07232
- ChemSpider: 10134775
- UNII: 01O4K0631N
- KEGG: D09692
- ChEMBL: ChEMBL506871
- CompTox Dashboard (EPA): DTXSID90238456
- ECHA InfoCard: 100.206.770

Chemical and physical data
- Formula: C_{13}H_{16}N_{4}O
- Molar mass: 244.298 g·mol^{−1}
- 3D model (JSmol): Interactive image
- SMILES: C[C@]3(c2nc1c(C(N)=O)cccc1[nH]2)CCCN3
- InChI: InChI=1S/C13H16N4O/c1-13(6-3-7-15-13)12-16-9-5-2-4-8(11(14)18)10(9)17-12/h2,4-5,15H,3,6-7H2,1H3,(H2,14,18)(H,16,17)/t13-/m1/s1; Key:JNAHVYVRKWKWKQ-CYBMUJFWSA-N

Veliparib (ABT-888) is a potential anti-cancer drug acting as a PARP inhibitor. It kills cancer cells by blocking a protein called PARP, thereby preventing the repair of DNA or genetic damage in cancer cells and possibly making them more susceptible to anticancer treatments. Veliparib may make whole brain radiation treatment work more effectively against brain metastases from NSCLC. It has been shown to potentiate the effects of many chemotherapeutics, and as such has been part of many combination clinical trials.

It inhibits both PARP1 and PARP2 and thereby induces synthetic lethality. It is still being evaluated for the treatment of ovarian cancer.

== Development ==
Veliparib is being developed by AbbVie. It was derived from a prior lead compound (A 620223). The FDA awarded orphan drug status in November 2016 for NSCLC.

=== Clinical trials ===
As of 2017, 96 clinical trials involving veliparib had been registered with the FDA. It was included in the I-SPY2 breast cancer trial.

Numerous phase I clinical trials are in progress. Over 40 phase II clinical trials have been registered, for indications such as metastatic melanoma, NSCLC, prostate cancer and brain tumors associated with metastatic primary tumors.

Combination trials have evaluated veliparib in combination with doxorubicin, temozolomide, topotecan, carboplatin, paclitaxel, pemetrexed, cyclophosphamide, gemcitabine, and others.

By June 2014 it was in three phase III trials, for advanced ovarian cancer, triple-negative breast cancer and in non-small cell lung cancer (NSCLC). In 2017, AbbVie reported that veliparib failed to improve outcomes in the triple-negative breast cancer and NSCLC trials.
