= Taofeek Owonikoko =

American physician and professor

Taofeek Kunle Owonikoko
- Born: Nigeria
- Education: Obafemi Awolowo University; Lagos University Teaching Hospital; Heinrich Heine University Düsseldorf
- Scientific career
- Workplaces: Emory University; Johns Hopkins University
- Thesis: Genetische Heterogenität in Adenokarzinomen des Ösophagus (2000)

Taofeek Kunle Owonikoko is an American physician who is Professor and Vice-Chair for Faculty Development, Department of Haematology and Medical Oncology at the Winship Cancer Institute. His research considers small cell lung cancer. He was a 2019 Emory University Woodruff Leadership Academy Fellow.

== Early life and education ==
Owonikoko is from Nigeria. He attended the Obafemi Awolowo University, where he specialised in medicine. Owonikoko completed his residency at the Lagos University Teaching Hospital. In 1998 he was awarded a German research fellowship to join Heinrich Heine University Düsseldorf. Whilst in Germany Owonikoko earned a doctoral degree in anatomical pathology.

== Research and career ==
In 2001 Owonikoko joined Johns Hopkins University as a postdoctoral fellow, where he worked in molecular imaging. Owonikoko was designated as a Distinguished Cancer Scholar in the Georgia Cancer Coalition in 2008. That year he joined Emory University as an associate professor.

He specialises in small cell lung cancer. He leads clinical trials into novel immunotherapy drugs, which can be used to treat aggressive and recurrent cancers. He has studied the efficacy of talazoparib as a treatment for small cell lung cancer patients with homologous recombination repair deficiency.

Owonikoko has called for more people of color to be involved with clinical cancer trials. In particular, Black patients are below 4% of patients involved in clinical trials for lung cancer. He believes that this underrepresentation perpetuates healthcare outcome inequality.

== Awards and honours ==
- 2008 Who's Who
- 2016 National Cancer Institute Cancer Clinical Investigator Team Leadership Award
- 2019 Emory University Woodruff Leadership Academy Fellow

== Selected publications ==
- Owonikoko, Taofeek K.; Ragin, Camille C.; Belani, Chandra P.; Oton, Ana B.; Gooding, William E.; Taioli, Emanuela; Ramalingam, Suresh S. (2007-12-10). "Lung Cancer in Elderly Patients: An Analysis of the Surveillance, Epidemiology, and End Results Database". Journal of Clinical Oncology. 25 (35): 5570–5577. doi:10.1200/JCO.2007.12.5435. ISSN 0732-183X. PMID 18065729.
- Ramalingam, Suresh S.; Owonikoko, Taofeek K.; Khuri, Fadlo R. (2011-03-08). "Lung cancer: New biological insights and recent therapeutic advances". CA: A Cancer Journal for Clinicians. 61 (2): 91–112. doi:10.3322/caac.20102. PMID 21303969. S2CID 12655853.
- Owonikoko, Taofeek Kunle; Hussain, Arif; Stadler, Walter Michael; Smith, David C.; Kluger, Harriet; Molina, Ana M.; Gulati, Parul; Shah, Aadhar; Ahlers, Christoph Matthias; Cardarelli, Pina M.; Cohen, Lewis J. (2016). "First-in-human multicenter phase I study of BMS-936561 (MDX-1203), an antibody-drug conjugate targeting CD70". Cancer Chemotherapy and Pharmacology. 77 (1): 155–162. doi:10.1007/s00280-015-2909-2. ISSN 0344-5704. PMID 26576779. S2CID 20799503.
