= HBOC =

HBOC may refer to:

- Hemoglobin-based oxygen carriers; a type of oxygen-carrying blood substitute
- Hereditary breast–ovarian cancer syndrome; a syndrome where breast and ovarian cancer occurrences in the family are suspected to be due to a hereditary factor
- HBO & Company; a medical information systems firm, now part of McKesson Corporation
