= Salpingo-oophorectomy =

Removal of an ovary and its fallopian tube

- Specialty: Gynaecology
- ICD-9-CM: 65.4, 65.6

A salpingo-oophorectomy is the removal of an ovary and its fallopian tube. As a risk-reducing surgery, this procedure is the most effective form of prevention in women carrying gene mutations which put them at higher risk of developing ovarian cancer, such as a BRCA mutation. It is particularly important in mutations of the normally tumor suppressing BRCA1 gene, or, with a statistically lower negative impact, in those of the tumour suppressing BRCA2 gene, which can increase the risk of developing ovarian cancer to as high as 65% and 25%, respectively.

In a bilateral salpingo-oophorectomy (BSO) both ovaries are removed, leading to a surgical menopause, as the body is deprived of estrogen, a hormone normally produced in the ovaries. Hormone replacement therapy is generally recommended after BSO, unless there is a history of triple-negative breast cancer.

== See also ==
- List of surgeries by type
- Oophorectomy
