= Hereditary breast–ovarian cancer syndrome =

- Other names: HBOC
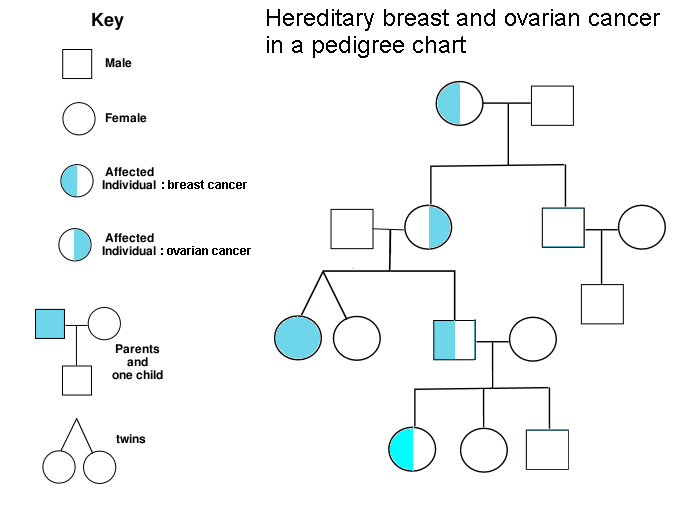
- Ovarian and breast cancer patients in a pedigree chart of a family
- Specialty: Obstetrics and gynaecology, endocrinology, dermatology, oncology, medical genetics

Hereditary breast–ovarian cancer syndromes (HBOC) are cancer syndromes that produce higher than normal levels of breast cancer, ovarian cancer and additional cancers in genetically related families (either one individual had both, or several individuals in the pedigree had one or the other disease). It accounts for 90% of the hereditary cancers. The hereditary factors may be proven or suspected to cause the pattern of breast and ovarian cancer occurrences in the family. The name HBOC may be misleading because it implies that this genetic susceptibility to cancer is mainly in women. In reality, both sexes have the same rates of gene mutations, and HBOC can predispose to other cancers, including prostate cancer and pancreatic cancer. For this reason, the term "King syndrome" has recently come into use. The new name references Mary-Claire King who identified the genes BRCA1 and BRCA2.

Most hereditary breast-ovarian cancer syndromes are inherited in an autosomal dominant pattern. Biallelic and homozygous inheritance of defective alleles that confer this syndrome is usually an embryonically lethal condition; live cases usually experience a severe form of Fanconi anemia.

== Causes ==
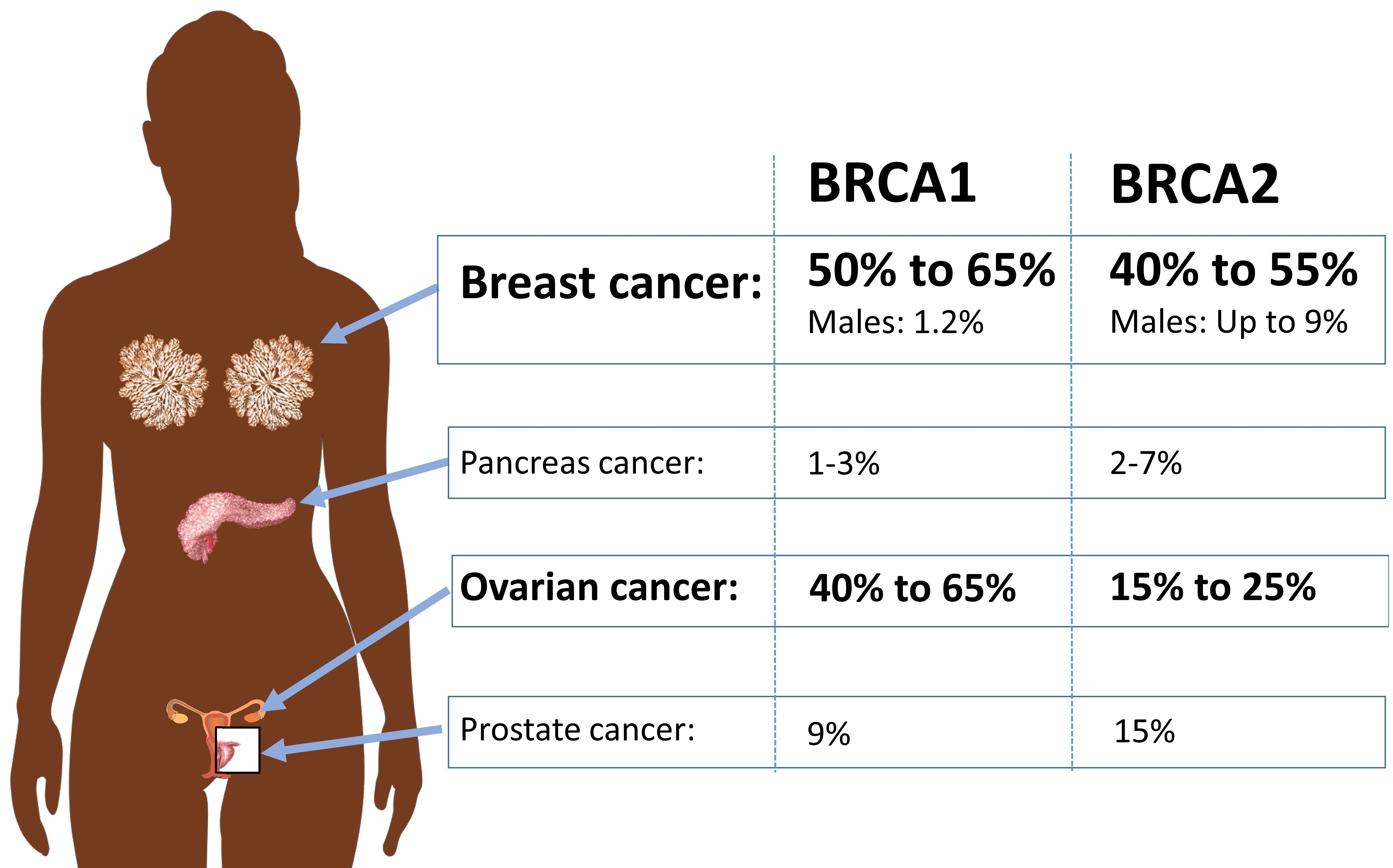
Absolute risk of cancers in BRCA1 or BRCA2 mutation.

Several genes are associated with HBOC. The most common of the known causes of HBOC are:

- BRCA mutations: Harmful mutations in the BRCA1 and BRCA2 genes can produce very high rates of breast and ovarian cancer, as well as increased rates of other cancers. Mutations in BRCA1 are associated with a 39-46% risk of ovarian cancer, and mutations in BRCA2 are associated with a 10-27% risk of ovarian cancer.

Other identified genes include:

- MLH1, MSH2, MSH6, PMS2: mutations in genes that lead to Lynch Syndrome put individuals at risk for ovarian cancer.
- TP53: Mutations cause Li-Fraumeni syndrome. It produces particularly high rates of breast cancer among younger women with mutated genes, and despite being rare, 4% of women with breast cancer under age 30 have a mutation in this gene.
- PTEN: Mutations cause Cowden syndrome, which produces hamartomas (benign polyps) in the colon, skin growths, and other clinical signs, as well as an increased risk for many cancers.
- CDH1: Mutations are associated with lobular breast cancer and gastric cancer.
- STK11: Mutations produce Peutz–Jeghers syndrome. It is extremely rare, and creates a predisposition to breast cancer, intestinal cancer, and pancreatic cancer.
- CHEK2: Approximately one out of 40 northern Europeans has a mutation in this gene, making it a common mutation. It is also one of the most frequently mutated genes after BRCA among Hispanics in the United States. Considered a moderate-risk mutation, it may double or triple the carrier's lifetime risk of breast cancer, and also increase the risk of colon cancer and prostate cancer.
- ATM: Mutations cause ataxia telangectasia; female carriers have approximately double the normal risk of developing breast cancer.
- PALB2: Studies vary in their estimate of the risk from mutations in this gene, and the frequency of mutations in this gene may be different among different populations. It may be moderate risk, or as high as BRCA2.

For many of these genes, inheriting both defective alleles usually results in an embryonically lethal phenotype. Live cases suffer from a severe form of Fanconi Anemia; biallelic mutations of BRCA1 lead to Fanconi anemia complementation group S, and biallelic mutations of BRCA2 lead to complementation group D1.

Approximately 45% of HBOC cases involve unidentified genes or multiple genes.

== Prevention ==
People with BRCA1 and BRCA2 mutations are recommended to have a transvaginal ultrasound 1-2 times per year. Screening with CA-125 is also recommended.

Prophylactic salpingo-oophorectomy (removal of the ovaries and fallopian tubes to prevent cancer) is recommended at age 35-40 for people with BRCA1 mutations and at age 40-45 for people with BRCA2 mutations. An increasing number women who test positive for faulty BRCA1 or BRCA2 genes choose to have risk-reducing surgery. At the same time, the average waiting time for undergoing the procedure is two years, which is much longer than recommended.
