= Iniparib =

Chemical compound

Clinical data
- ATC code: None

Legal status
- Legal status: Development terminated

Identifiers
- IUPAC name: 4-Iodo-3-nitrobenzamide
- CAS Number: 160003-66-7
- PubChem CID: 9796068
- ChemSpider: 7971834
- UNII: 2ZWI7KHK8F
- KEGG: D09913
- ChEMBL: ChEMBL1170047
- CompTox Dashboard (EPA): DTXSID30166784
- ECHA InfoCard: 100.210.980

Chemical and physical data
- Formula: C_{7}H_{5}IN_{2}O_{3}
- Molar mass: 292.032 g·mol^{−1}
- 3D model (JSmol): Interactive image
- SMILES: c1cc(c(cc1C(=O)N)[N+](=O)[O-])I
- InChI: InChI=1S/C7H5IN2O3/c8-5-2-1-4(7(9)11)3-6(5)10(12)13/h1-3H,(H2,9,11); Key:MDOJTZQKHMAPBK-UHFFFAOYSA-N

Iniparib (INN, previously known as BSI 201) was a drug candidate for cancer treatment. It was originally believed to act as an irreversible inhibitor of PARP1 (hence, a PARP inhibitor) and possibly other enzymes through covalent modification, but its effects against PARP were later disproven. It underwent clinical trials for treatment of some types of breast cancer, but was discontinued after disappointing phase III clinical trials.

== History ==
Iniparib was the first putative PARP inhibitor to commence phase III clinical trials. The first was for breast cancer, another was for squamous-cell lung cancer. Preliminary results in June 2009 on triple-negative breast cancer were promising. Later results showed increased median survival of triple-negative breast cancer patients from 7.7 to 12.2 months.

In 2009, the FDA began fast-tracking the new drug application of iniparib for triple-negative breast cancer. However, phase III results disclosed in January 2011 were disappointing.

Iniparib was also studied as a potential chemotherapeutic agent in the fight against malignant glioma, including glioblastoma. Glioma is a resilient type of primary brain tumor (not metastatic) that currently has limited effective therapies, especially for patients whose tumors are in an inoperable location of the brain, such as the interior of the brainstem.

During the 2013 American Society of Clinical Oncology conference, Sanofi disclosed that iniparib failed to help lung-cancer patients in a late-stage trial, prompting the company to end research into the once-promising compound and take a $285 million charge.
