= Fuzuloparib =

Pharmaceutical drug

Clinical data
- Trade names: Airuiyi
- Other names: Fluzoparib; SHR3162
- ATC code: None

Identifiers
- IUPAC name: 4-[[4-Fluoro-3-[2-(trifluoromethyl)-6,8-dihydro-5H-[1,2,4]triazolo[1,5-a]pyrazine-7-carbonyl]phenyl]methyl]-2H-phthalazin-1-one
- CAS Number: 1358715-18-0
- PubChem CID: 56649297
- DrugBank: DB15637
- ChemSpider: 68027910
- UNII: TWF0ML1CK8
- ChEMBL: ChEMBL3930624

Chemical and physical data
- Formula: C_{22}H_{16}F_{4}N_{6}O_{2}
- Molar mass: 472.404 g·mol^{−1}
- 3D model (JSmol): Interactive image
- SMILES: C1CN2C(=NC(=N2)C(F)(F)F)CN1C(=O)C3=C(C=CC(=C3)CC4=NNC(=O)C5=CC=CC=C54)F
- InChI: InChI=InChI=1S/C22H16F4N6O2/c23-16-6-5-12(10-17-13-3-1-2-4-14(13)19(33)29-28-17)9-15(16)20(34)31-7-8-32-18(11-31)27-21(30-32)22(24,25)26/h1-6,9H,7-8,10-11H2,(H,29,33); Key:XJGXCBHXFWBOTN-UHFFFAOYSA-N

Fuzuloparib (trade name Airuiyi) is a pharmaceutical drug for the treatment of ovarian cancer. It is approved for use in China. It is an inhibitor of the poly (ADP-ribose) polymerase (PARP) enzyme.

It is also being studied for its potential use for the treatment of pancreatic, breast, prostate, and lung cancer.
