= Susan Domchek =

American oncologist

Susan M. Domchek is an oncologist at the University of Pennsylvania, Executive Director of the Basser Center for BRCA, the Basser Professor in Oncology at the Perelman School of Medicine, and Director of the Mariann and Robert MacDonald Cancer Risk Evaluation Program at Penn Medicine. She has authored more than 250 articles in scholarly journals. In 2018, Domchek was elected to the National Academy of Medicine.

== Career ==
In 2011, she led the organization of the international team of physician scientists known as BRCA-TAC, which led a charge to advance clinical testing of olaparib in cancer patients with known inherited mutations in BRCA1 and BRCA2. Cancers that are associated with BRCA1 and BRCA2 include breast cancer in men and women, ovarian cancer, melanoma, prostate and pancreatic cancer.

In 2012, Domchek was named Executive Director of the Basser Center for BRCA at Penn Medicine's Abramson Cancer Center. In 2015, Domchek was awarded the William Osler Patient Oriented Research Award for her clinical research in breast cancer genetics. In 2018, Domchek was elected to the National Academy of Medicine and was honored with the 2018 Spirit of Empowerment by the non-profit organization Facing Our Risk of Cancer Empowered.
