= Lisa A. Carey =

Distinguished Professor in Breast Cancer Research

- Education: Wellesley College (BA); Johns Hopkins School of Medicine (MD)

Lisa A. Carey is a Distinguished Professor in Breast Cancer Research at UNC School of Medicine, Division Chief of Hematology and Oncology, and physician-in-chief of the N.C. Cancer Hospital, UNC Lineberger's clinical home. She studied at the Johns Hopkins School of Public Health, and was named co-chair of the Alliance National Cooperative Group Breast Committee in 2016.

== Career ==
In 1998, Carey was hired as a faculty member at the University of North Carolina at Chapel Hill. As a result of her work, Carey was awarded a Doris Duke Clinical Scientist Award in 1999 and was inducted into the Johns Hopkins Society of Scholars in 2008. In 2012, Carey was elected to the board of trustees for Blue Cross and Blue Shield of North Carolina and in 2016, was named co-chair of the Alliance National Cooperative Group Breast Committee in 2016. In 2018, Carey was selected to serve on the Susan G. Komen's Scientific Advisory Board.
