= Ductal lavage =

Ductal lavage is a screening method used in at-risk women for breast cancer detection. In this method, cells are collected from milk ducts in the breast. The procedure involves inserting a catheter (tube) into the nipple, which releases a small amount of salt water into the duct. The water picks up breast cells and the entire fluid is then retrieved and sent to be examined for cells, which are checked under a microscope. Apart from clinical breast examination and mammography, ductal lavage can also be used to detect breast cancer.

== Procedure ==
Ductal lavage is a non-invasive screening procedure. It is used to detect precancerous and cancerous cells in the breast ducts. It is a safe and well-tolerated procedure. Some doctors might apply anesthetic cream to numb the nipple area. In ductal lavage, the doctor applies suction to the nipple in order to bring out fluid from the milk ducts that eventually end at the nipple. A micro-catheter is inserted into the milk duct and the fluid is washed into the duct to rinse out the cells. The fluid is then retrieved from the nipple and sent for laboratory evaluation. This procedure is also called a "Breast Pap-Smear" by some doctors.

== Ductal Lavage and Detection for Breast Cancer ==
There is much controversy around whether or not does ductal lavage actually help detect breast cancer. Earlier researchers, in particular, have deemed it has a good tool for risk assessment for breast cancer. Though a 2004 study led by researchers at Northwestern Memorial Hospital, which also appeared in the Journal of the National Cancer Institute, argued that ductal lavage might not be an effective method for detecting breast cancer. Seema Khan, M.D., the lead author of the study and the interim director of the Lynn Sage Comprehensive Breast Center and surgeon at Northwestern Memorial Hospital explained, "This study raises serious questions about the utility of ductal lavage as a cancer detection test and shows us that women should not be offered ductal lavage as a method of breast cancer detection. Mammography and physical examination remain the most effective methods of early detection. Ductal lavage does remain promising as a method for obtaining more information about the level of breast cancer risk."
