= PARP inhibitor =

Pharmacological enzyme inhibitors of poly (ADP-ribose) polymerases

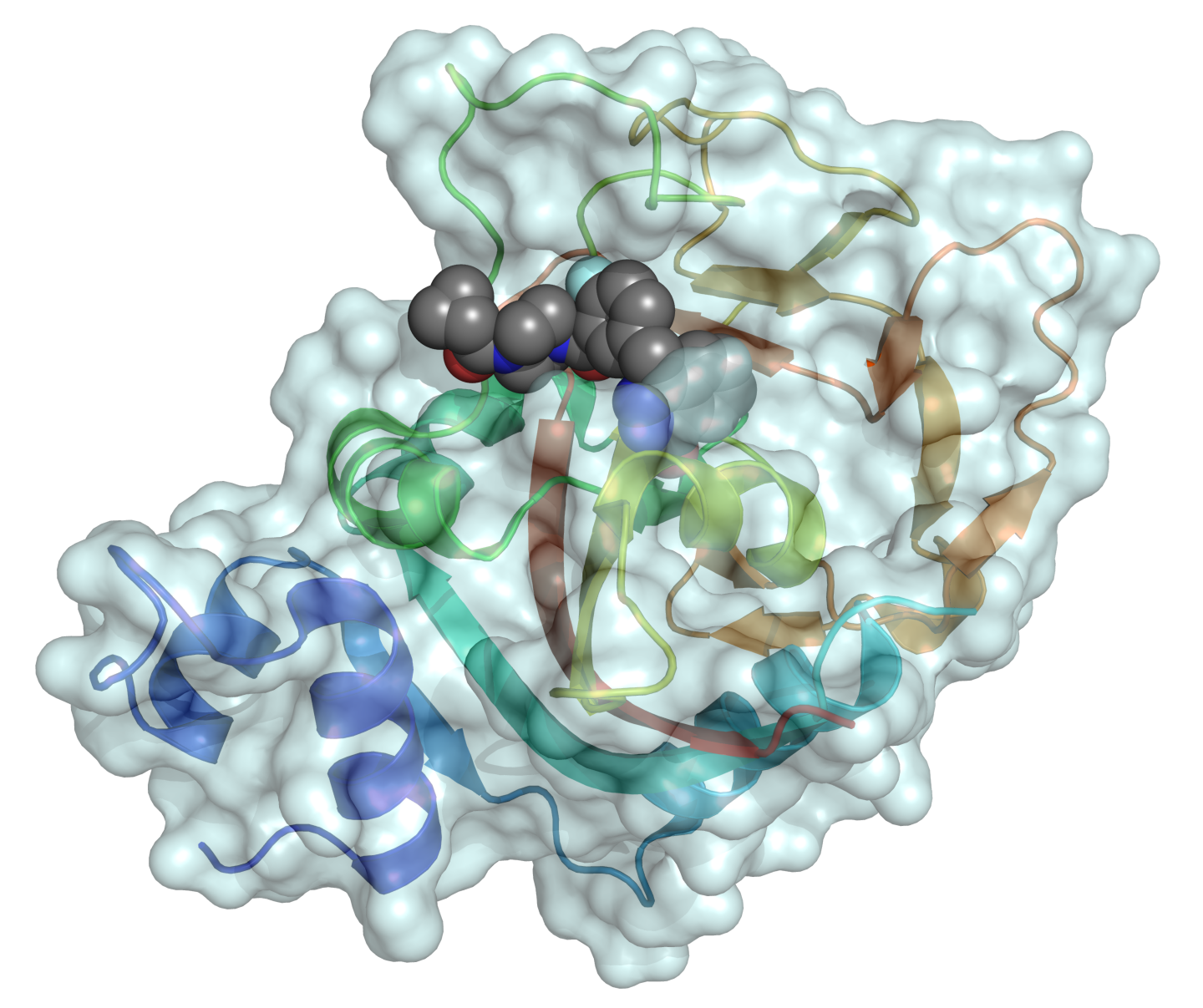
Model of the inhibitor olaparib (dark gray) occupying the NAD^{+}-binding site of PARP1. From PDB: 5DS3.

PARP inhibitors are a class of drugs that are a group of pharmacological inhibitors of the enzyme poly ADP ribose polymerase (PARP), which plays a role in repairing DNA in damaged cells.

Medical uses of these drugs include the treatment of heritable cancers. Several forms of cancer are more dependent on PARP than regular cells, making PARP (PARP1, PARP2 etc.) an attractive target for cancer therapy. PARP inhibitors appear to improve progression-free survival in women with recurrent platinum-sensitive ovarian cancer, as evidenced mainly by olaparib added to conventional treatment.

In addition to their use in cancer therapy, PARP inhibitors are considered a potential treatment for acute life-threatening diseases, such as stroke and myocardial infarction, as well as for long-term neurodegenerative diseases.

== Medical uses ==
=== Approved for marketing ===
- Olaparib: In December, 2014, the EMA and US FDA approved it as monotherapy (at 400 mg taken twice per day) for patients with germline BRCA mutated (gBRCAm) advanced ovarian cancer who have been treated with three or more prior lines of chemotherapy.
- Rucaparib: On December 19, 2016, the US FDA granted accelerated approval for previously treated BRCA-mutant ovarian cancer. In April 2018, it was granted FDA approval.
- Niraparib: In March 2017, the US FDA approved it for epithelial ovarian, fallopian tube, and primary peritoneal cancer. It inhibits PARP1 and PARP2.
- Talazoparib: In 2018, the US FDA approved it for breast cancer with germline BRCA mutations.

=== Combination with radiotherapy ===
The main function of radiotherapy is to produce DNA strand breaks, causing severe DNA damage and leading to cell death. Radiotherapy has the potential to kill 100% of any targeted cells, but the dose required to do so would cause unacceptable side effects to healthy tissue. Radiotherapy therefore can only be given up to a certain level of radiation exposure. Combining radiation therapy with PARP inhibitors offers promise, since the inhibitors would lead to formation of double strand breaks from the single-strand breaks generated by the radiotherapy in tumor tissue with BRCA1/BRCA2 mutations. This combination could therefore lead to either more powerful therapy with the same radiation dose or similarly powerful therapy with a lower radiation dose.

== Mechanism of action ==
DNA is damaged thousands of times during each cell cycle, and that damage must be repaired, including in cancer cells. Otherwise the cells may die due to this damage. Chemotherapy and radiation therapy attempt to kill cancer cells by inducing high levels of DNA damage. By inhibiting PARP1 DNA repair, the effectiveness of these therapies can be increased.

BRCA1, BRCA2 and PALB2 are proteins that are important for the repair of double-strand DNA breaks by the error-free homologous recombinational repair, or HRR, pathway. When the gene for one of these proteins is mutated, the change can lead to errors in DNA repair that can eventually cause breast cancer. Mutations in these genes can also cause ovarian, endometrial, pancreatic and prostate cancers. When subjected to enough damage at one time, the altered gene can cause the death of the cells.

PARP1 is a protein that is important for repairing single-strand breaks ('nicks' in the DNA). If such nicks persist unrepaired until DNA is replicated (which must precede cell division), then the replication itself can cause double strand breaks to form. The main function of PARP (located in the cell nucleus) is to detect and initiate an immediate cellular response to metabolic, chemical, or radiation-induced single-strand DNA breaks (SSB) by signaling the enzymatic machinery employed in the SSB repair. Cancer cells that are already deficient in homologous recombination DNA repair (due to mutation in BRCA1, BRCA2, or PALB2) are sensitive to targeted inhibition of PARP, a key component of alternative backup repair pathways. Identifying cancer patients with homologous recombination deficiency biomarkers indicates those patients likely to benefit from PARP inhibitor therapies.

Drugs that inhibit PARP1 cause multiple double strand breaks to form in this way, and in tumours with BRCA1, BRCA2 or PALB2 mutations, these double strand breaks cannot be efficiently repaired, leading to the death of the cells. Normal cells that do not replicate their DNA as often as cancer cells, and that lack any mutated BRCA1 or BRCA2 still have homologous repair operating, which allows them to survive the inhibition of PARP.

PARP inhibitors lead to trapping of PARP proteins on DNA in addition to blocking their catalytic action. This interferes with replication, causing cell death preferentially in cancer cells, which grow faster than non-cancerous cells.

Some cancer cells that lack the tumor suppressor PTEN may be sensitive to PARP inhibitors because of downregulation of Rad51, a critical homologous recombination component, although other data suggest PTEN may not regulate Rad51. Hence PARP inhibitors may be effective against many PTEN-defective tumours (e.g. some aggressive prostate cancers).

Cancer cells that are low in oxygen (e.g. in fast growing tumors) are sensitive to PARP inhibitors.

Excessive PARP-1 activity may exacerbate the pathogenesis of stroke, myocardial infarction, neurodegeneration, and a number of other disease conditions due to excessive inflammation. Thus, reduction of inflammation by PARP-1 inhibition can mitigate these conditions. PARP inhibitors such as olaparib, under experimental conditions, appear to be beneficial in limiting atrial fibrillation and other DNA damage associated cardiovascular diseases.

== Adverse effects and contraindications ==
Side effects of PARP inhibitor treatment for cancer may include neutropenia, and a risk of anaemia. People who take this medication also commonly report fatigue. The toxicity profile of PARP inhibitors when treating cancer has not been found to be more serious than chemotherapy agents, however, further research is needed to understand the effects of this medication on quality of life after treatment.

When combining PARP inhibitor treatment with concurrent chemotherapy, the risk of more serious side effects or adverse effects is thought to increase from 45% (chemotherapy alone) to 51% (chemotherapy plus PARP inhibitor therapy).

== Research ==
=== Examples of clinical trials ===
Started Phase III:

- Talazoparib after trials for advanced hematological malignancies and for advanced or recurrent solid tumors. it started in 2013 a phase III for metastatic germline BRCA mutated breast cancer.
- Veliparib is in phase III trials as of June 2014, for advanced ovarian cancer, triple-negative breast cancer and in non-small cell lung cancer (NSCLC).
- Pamiparib (BGB-290) For ovarian cancer, the 1st patient enrolled in May 2018. It is a PARP1 and PARP2 inhibitor.

Started Phase II:

- Olaparib (developed by AstraZeneca) for breast, ovarian and colorectal cancer.
- Olaparib TOPARP-A trial for use in advanced prostate cancer (published c. April 21, 2015).
- Rucaparib for metastatic breast and ovarian cancer.
- Veliparib for metastatic melanoma.
- CEP 9722 for non-small-cell lung cancer (NSCLC)
- E7016 (developed by Eisai): underwent phase II trial in melanoma.

Others:

- Fuzuloparib is also being studied for its potential use for the treatment of pancreatic, breast, prostate, and lung cancer. It is used for ovarian cancer. It is approved for use in China.

Currently Discontinued:

- Iniparib (BSI 201, developed by Sanofi) was determined in 2012 not to be a true PARP inhibitor and failed trial for triple negative breast cancer. In 2013, Sanofi disclosed that iniparib failed to help squamous cell lung cancer patients in a phase III trial, prompting the company to end research into the once-promising compound.

Experimental:

- 3-Aminobenzamide, a prototypical PARP inhibitor.

=== Studies of PARP inhibitor resistance ===
Despite the clinical success of PARP inhibitors, their efficacy is limited by the development of resistance. Overcoming resistance has thus become a major focus within the PARP inhibitor research field, prompting comprehensive studies into resistance mechanisms. At present, reversion-driven HR restoration has been established as the most common resistance mechanism. Reversion-driven HR restoration is the result of secondary mutation events within BRCA1, BRCA2, or other HR-related factors, which restore protein function and, thus, HR proficiency. HR can also be re-established without reversion events. For example, loss of end-protection (e.g. via 53BP1 loss), has been shown to restore HR. Other resistance mechanisms include enhanced drug efflux, restoration of DNA replication fork protection, mutations in PARP1, and PARG downregulation.

== See also ==
- PARP1
- Parthanatos – PARP-1 dependent cell death
