= Olaparib =

Chemical compound (cancer therapy drug)

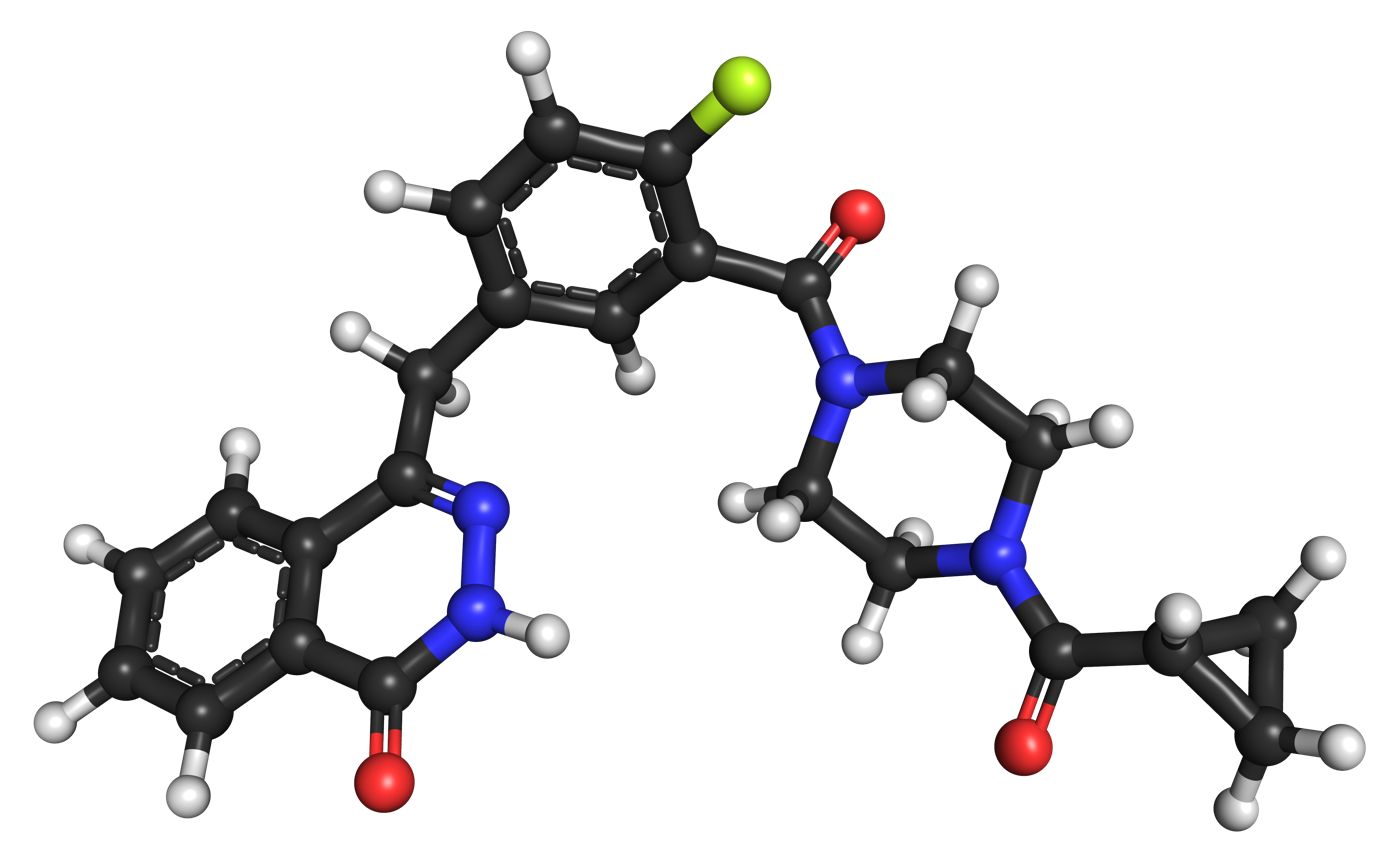
- Above: molecular structure of olaparib Below: 3D representation of an olaparib molecule

Clinical data
- Trade names: Lynparza, others
- Other names: AZD-2281, MK-7339, KU0059436
- AHFS/Drugs.com: Monograph
- MedlinePlus: a614060
- License data: US DailyMed: Olaparib
- Pregnancy category: AU: D
- Routes of administration: By mouth
- ATC code: L01XK01 (WHO)

Legal status
- Legal status: AU: S4 (Prescription only); CA: ℞-only; UK: POM (Prescription only); US: ℞-only; EU: Rx-only; In general: ℞ (Prescription only)

Identifiers
- IUPAC name: 4-[(3-[(4-cyclopropylcarbonyl)piperazin-1-yl]carbonyl) -4-fluorophenyl]methyl(2H)phthalazin-1-one
- CAS Number: 763113-22-0
- PubChem CID: 23725625
- IUPHAR/BPS: 7519
- DrugBank: DB09074
- ChemSpider: 23343272
- UNII: WOH1JD9AR8
- KEGG: D09730
- ChEBI: CHEBI:83766
- ChEMBL: ChEMBL521686
- PDB ligand: 09L (PDBe, RCSB PDB)
- CompTox Dashboard (EPA): DTXSID60917988
- ECHA InfoCard: 100.170.811

Chemical and physical data
- Formula: C_{24}H_{23}FN_{4}O_{3}
- Molar mass: 434.471 g·mol^{−1}
- 3D model (JSmol): Interactive image
- SMILES: c4cccc2c4c(n[nH]c2=O)Cc(ccc1F)cc1C(=O)N3CCN(CC3)C(=O)C5CC5
- InChI: InChI=1S/C24H23FN4O3/c25-20-8-5-15(14-21-17-3-1-2-4-18(17)22(30)27-26-21)13-19(20)24(32)29-11-9-28(10-12-29)23(31)16-6-7-16/h1-5,8,13,16H,6-7,9-12,14H2,(H,27,30); Key:FDLYAMZZIXQODN-UHFFFAOYSA-N

Olaparib, sold under the brand name Lynparza, is a medication for the maintenance treatment of BRCA-mutated advanced ovarian cancer in adults. It is a PARP inhibitor, inhibiting poly ADP ribose polymerase (PARP), an enzyme involved in DNA repair. It acts against cancers in people with hereditary BRCA1 or BRCA2 mutations, which include some ovarian, breast, and prostate cancers.

In December 2014, olaparib was approved for use as a single agent by the European Medicines Agency (EMA) in the European Union and by the Food and Drug Administration (FDA) in the United States.

== Medical uses ==
Olaparib is indicated to treat breast cancer, ovarian cancer, fallopian tube cancer, peritoneal cancer, pancreatic cancer, and prostate cancer.

== Side effects ==
Side effects include gastrointestinal effects such as nausea, vomiting, and loss of appetite; fatigue; muscle and joint pain; and low blood counts such as anemia, with occasional leukemia. Somnolence was sometimes seen in clinical trials which used doses higher than the approved schedule.

== Mechanism of action ==
Olaparib acts as an inhibitor of the enzyme poly ADP ribose polymerase (PARP), and is termed a PARP inhibitor. BRCA1/2 mutations may be genetically predisposed to development of some forms of cancer, and may be resistant to other forms of cancer treatment. However, these cancers sometimes have a unique vulnerability, as the cancer cells have increased reliance on PARP to repair their DNA and enable them to continue dividing. This means that drugs which selectively inhibit PARP may be of benefit if the cancers are susceptible to this treatment.

== History ==
Olaparib was developed and first dosed into patients by the UK-based biotechnology company, KuDOS Pharmaceuticals, that was founded by Stephen Jackson of Cambridge University, UK. Since KuDOS was acquired by AstraZeneca in 2006, the drug has undergone clinical development by AstraZeneca and Merck & Co.

In December 2014, the US Food and Drug Administration (FDA) and the European Medicines Agency (EMA) approved olaparib as monotherapy. The FDA approval is in germline BRCA mutated (gBRCAm) advanced ovarian cancer that has received three or more prior lines of chemotherapy. The EMA public assessment report, which utilized the same phase II trial data, made reference to both "high grade serous ovarian cancers" and to the use of olaparib "not later than 8 weeks after a course of platinum-based medicines, when the tumour was diminishing in size or had completely disappeared".

Olaparib in combination with temozolomide demonstrated substantial clinical activity in relapsed small cell lung cancer.

The FDA approval was for germline BRCA mutated (gBRCAm) advanced ovarian cancer that has received three or more prior lines of chemotherapy. In January 2018, olaparib became the first PARP inhibitor to be approved by the FDA for gBRCAm metastatic breast cancer.

In breast cancer, olaparib is approved for gBRCAm HER2-negative metastatic breast cancer patients who have previously been treated with chemotherapy in the neoadjuvant, adjuvant or metastatic setting. If patients have hormone receptor positive cancer, they should have received endocrine therapy where appropriate. This approval was based on the OlympiAD randomised phase III trial, which showed a progression-free survival benefit for patients treated with olaparib compared to conventional chemotherapy.

In August 2017, olaparib tablets were approved in the United States for the maintenance treatment of adults with recurrent epithelial ovarian, fallopian tube, or primary peritoneal cancer, who are in a complete or partial response to platinum-based chemotherapy. The formulation was changed from capsules to tablets and the capsules were phased out in the United States. The capsules and tablets are not interchangeable.

The approval in the maintenance setting was based on two randomized, placebo-controlled, double-blind, multicenter trials in patients with recurrent ovarian cancers who were in response to platinum-based therapy. SOLO-2 (NCT01874353) randomized 295 patients with recurrent germline BRCA-mutated ovarian, fallopian tube, or primary peritoneal cancer (2:1) to receive olaparib tablets 300 mg orally twice daily or placebo. SOLO-2 demonstrated a statistically significant improvement in investigator-assessed progression-free survival (PFS) in patients randomized to olaparib compared with those who received placebo, with a hazard ratio (HR) of 0.30 (95% CI: 0.22, 0.41; p<0.0001). Study 19 (NCT00753545) randomized 265 patients regardless of BRCA status (1:1) to receive olaparib capsules 400 mg orally twice daily or placebo. Study 19 demonstrated a statistically significant improvement in investigator-assessed PFS in patients treated with olaparib vs. placebo with a HR of 0.35.

In January 2018, olaparib was approved in the United States for the treatment of patients with certain types of breast cancer that have spread (metastasized) and whose tumors have a specific inherited (germline) genetic mutation, making it the first drug in its class (PARP inhibitor) approved to treat breast cancer, and it is the first time any drug has been approved to treat certain patients with metastatic breast cancer who have a "BRCA" gene mutation. Patients are selected for treatment with Lynparza based on an FDA-approved genetic test, called the BRACAnalysis CDx.

In December 2018, olaparib was approved in the United States for the maintenance treatment of adults with deleterious or suspected deleterious germline or somatic BRCA-mutated (gBRCAm or sBRCAm) advanced epithelial ovarian, fallopian tube or primary peritoneal cancer who are in complete or partial response to first-line platinum-based chemotherapy. Adults with gBRCAm advanced epithelial ovarian, fallopian tube or primary peritoneal cancer should be selected for therapy based on an FDA-approved companion diagnostic. Approval was based on SOLO-1 (NCT01844986), a randomized, double-blind, placebo-controlled, multi-center trial that compared the efficacy of olaparib with placebo in patients with BRCA-mutated (BRCAm) advanced ovarian, fallopian tube, or primary peritoneal cancer following first-line platinum-based chemotherapy. Patients were randomized (2:1) to receive olaparib tablets 300 mg orally twice daily (n=260) or placebo (n=131).

In December 2019, olaparib was approved for the maintenance treatment of adults with deleterious or suspected deleterious germline BRCA-mutated (gBRCAm) metastatic pancreatic adenocarcinoma, as detected by an FDA-approved test, whose disease has not progressed on at least 16 weeks of a first-line platinum-based chemotherapy regimen. The FDA also approved the BRACAnalysis CDx test (Myriad Genetic Laboratories, Inc.) as a companion diagnostic for the selection of patients with pancreatic cancer for treatment with olaparib based upon the identification of deleterious or suspected deleterious germline mutations in BRCA1 or BRCA2 genes. Efficacy was investigated in POLO (NCT02184195), a double-blind, placebo-controlled, multi-center trial that randomized (3:2) 154 patients with gBRCAm metastatic pancreatic adenocarcinoma to olaparib 300 mg orally twice daily or placebo until disease progression or unacceptable toxicity.

In March 2022, olaparib was approved for the adjuvant treatment of adults with deleterious or suspected deleterious germline BRCA-mutated (gBRCAm) human epidermal growth factor receptor 2 (HER2)-negative high-risk early breast cancer who have been treated with neoadjuvant or adjuvant chemotherapy.

In April 2023, the National Health Service (NHS) in Wales and England will administer Olaparib to cancer patients as part of its targeted therapy. This drug is developed to target specific malignancies connected to defective breast cancer (BRCA) gene variants. Through this move, 800 people—300 women with early breast cancer and 500 men with advanced prostate cancer will receive this drug for free. Andrew Tutt, a breast oncology professor at King's College London and Institute of Cancer Research said that this treatment increases patients' chances of surviving breast cancer. It can also extend a person's life in cases of prostate cancer. Tutt added that these were previously unattainable.
