= PARP2 =

Protein-coding gene in the species Homo sapiens

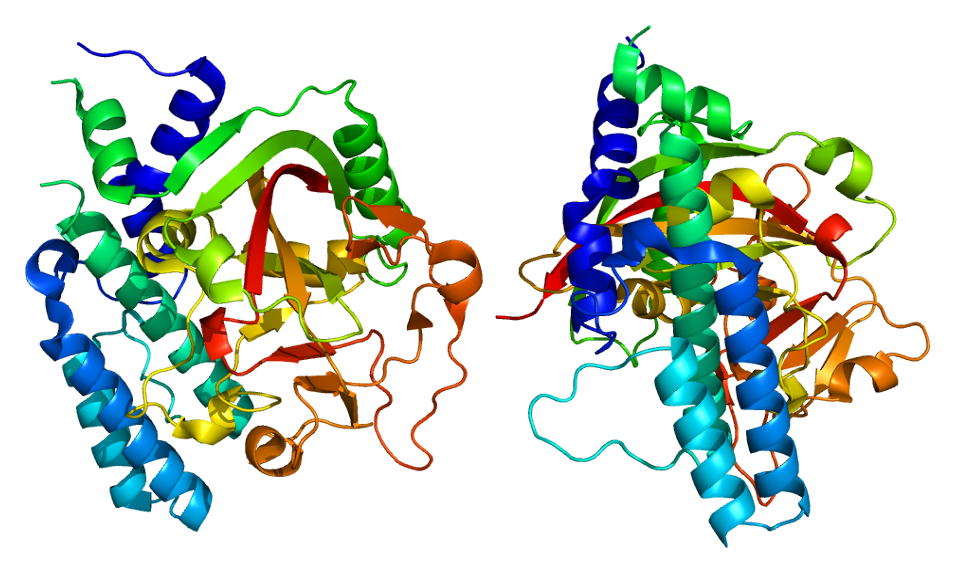

Identifiers
- Aliases: PARP2, ADPRT2, ADPRTL2, ADPRTL3, ARTD2, PARP-2, pADPRT-2, poly(ADP-ribose) polymerase 2
- External IDs: OMIM: 607725; MGI: 1341112; GeneCards: PARP2
Available structures
PDB	Ortholog search: PDBe RCSB
PDB	List of PDB id codes 3KCZ, 3KJD, 4PJV, 4TVJ, 4ZZX, 4ZZY, 5DSY, 5D5K
Enzyme activity
EC #	BRENDA	ExPASy	KEGG	MetaCyc
2.4.2.30	↗	↗	↗	↗

Gene location (Human)
Chr.	Chromosome 14 (human)
Band	14q11.2	Start	20,343,615 bp
Band	14q11.2	End	20,357,904 bp

Gene location (Mouse)
Chr.	Chromosome 14 (mouse)
Band	14 26.25 cM|14 C1	Start	51,045,298 bp
Band	14 26.25 cM|14 C1	End	51,058,758 bp
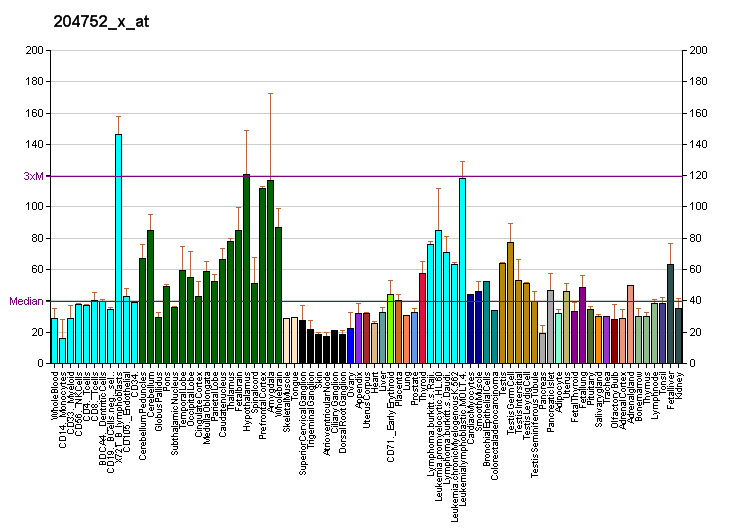

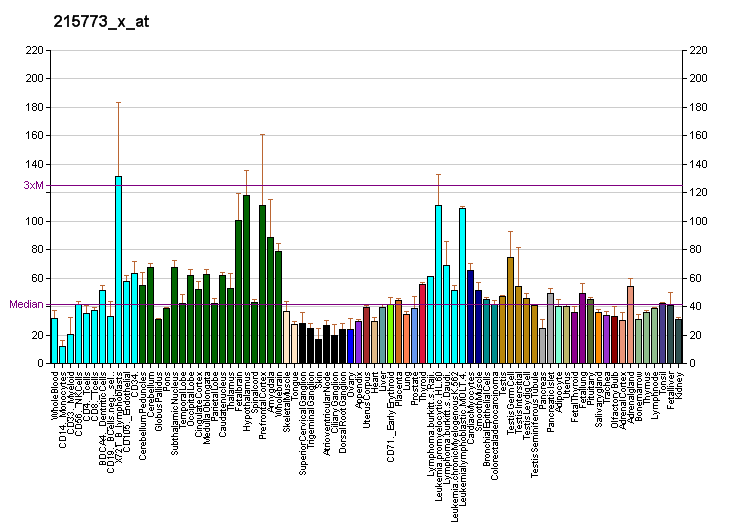

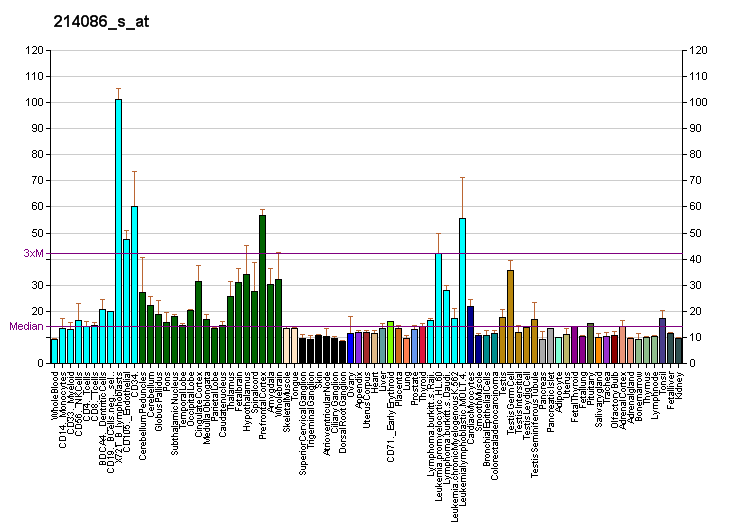
RNA expression pattern
Bgee	Human / Mouse (ortholog); Top expressed in: cerebellar hemisphere; right hemisphere of cerebellum; right frontal lobe; Brodmann area 9; gonad; ventricular zone; ganglionic eminence; prefrontal cortex; cerebellar vermis; left ovary / Top expressed in: tail of embryo; Ileal epithelium; genital tubercle; neural layer of retina; otic placode; epiblast; ventricular zone; embryo; primitive streak; embryo; More reference expression data
BioGPS	More reference expression data
Gene ontology
Molecular function	transferase activity; DNA binding; protein binding; DNA ligase (ATP) activity; glycosyltransferase activity; NAD+ ADP-ribosyltransferase activity; protein ADP-ribosylase activity; NAD DNA ADP-ribosyltransferase activity
Cellular component	cytoplasm; nucleolus; nucleus; nucleoplasm
Biological process	DNA ligation involved in DNA repair; lagging strand elongation; protein ADP-ribosylation; DNA repair; extrinsic apoptotic signaling pathway; base-excision repair; peptidyl-serine ADP-ribosylation; positive regulation of cell growth involved in cardiac muscle cell development; negative regulation of neuron death; double-strand break repair; protein poly-ADP-ribosylation; DNA ADP-ribosylation; cellular response to DNA damage stimulus
Sources:Amigo / QuickGO
Orthologs
Databases	NCBI: entry; OMA: entry
Species	Human	Mouse
Entrez	10038	11546
Ensembl	ENSG00000129484	ENSMUSG00000036023
UniProt	Q9UGN5	O88554
RefSeq (mRNA)	NM_001042618; NM_005484	NM_009632
RefSeq (protein)	NP_001036083; NP_005475	NP_033762
Location (UCSC)	Chr 14: 20.34 – 20.36 Mb	Chr 14: 51.05 – 51.06 Mb
PubMed search
- Wikidata
View/Edit Human	View/Edit Mouse

Poly [ADP-ribose] polymerase 2 is an enzyme that in humans is encoded by the PARP2 gene. It is one of the PARP family of enzymes.

== Function ==
This gene encodes poly(ADP-ribosyl)transferase-like 2 protein, which contains a catalytic domain and is capable of catalyzing a poly(ADP-ribosyl)ation reaction. This protein has a catalytic domain which is homologous to that of poly (ADP-ribosyl) transferase, but lacks an N-terminal DNA binding domain which activates the C-terminal catalytic domain of poly (ADP-ribosyl) transferase. The basic residues within the N-terminal region of this protein may bear potential DNA-binding properties, and may be involved in the nuclear and/or nucleolar targeting of the protein. Two alternatively spliced transcript variants encoding distinct isoforms have been found.

In the plant species Arabidopsis thaliana, PARP2 plays more significant roles than PARP1 in protective responses to DNA damage and bacterial pathogenesis. The plant PARP2 carries N-terminal SAP DNA binding motifs rather than the Zn-finger DNA binding motifs of plant and animal PARP1 proteins.

== PARP inhibitor drugs ==
Some PARP inhibitor anti-cancer drugs (primarily aimed at PARP1) also inhibit PARP2, e.g. niraparib.

== Interactions ==
PARP2 has been shown to interact with XRCC1.

PARP2 also interacts with HPF1.

PARP2 binds to and bridges blunt DNA ends.
