= Prophylactic surgery =

- Other names: Preventive surgery
- [edit on Wikidata]

Prophylactic surgery (also known as preventive surgery or risk-reducing surgery) is a form of surgery most commonly intended to minimize or eliminate the risk of a patient developing cancer in an organ or gland before development occurs. This is a life-saving procedure for those at high risk of developing cancer in certain organs. This category of surgery may include mastectomies, oophorectomies, colectomies and surgical corrections for conditions that include cryptorchidism (undescended testis). Another, less common use of prophylactic surgery is in the prevention of other diseases or to seek better health outcomes.

== History ==
Throughout much of history, preventive medical techniques have not been widely employed. Despite the prevalence of diseases such as syphilis, leprosy, and the black plague throughout the late Middle Ages, the concept of preventive medicine was unpopular despite advancements in quarantining and sanitary techniques. Furthermore, the high mortality rate of surgeries both during operation and post-operation deemed these procedures too risky for a preventive measure. This changed however with the introduction of anesthesia, advancements in anatomy and with the introduction of antiseptic or aseptic techniques. Continuing advancements in sanitary techniques in the 19th to 20th century allowed surgeons to consider prophylactic surgeries without running the high risk previously experienced.

== Patient considerations ==
One may choose to undergo prophylactic surgery if they believe that it is within their best interest to undergo a procedure in order to remove a high-risk organ or gland. There are several types of preventable surgeries that are known to substantially decrease the risk of future disease. Since prophylactic surgeries are usually permanent and irreversible, the pros and cons must be carefully weighed by individuals considering the procedure. There are a myriad of ethical, physiological, ⁣ and psychological considerations to be made before taking such a procedure.

There are both physical and mental implications that come with committing to a prophylactic surgery; often, alongside the initial disadvantages that are associated with any procedure, such as cost, time lost, recovery, and more, there are other reasons for opting out of an operation. Ethical and religious reasons are commonly considered, especially when in regard to the reproductive system and its function. Concerns about sexual and reproductive function and self-image are rather common on clear external surgeries or sexual/ reproductive related surgeries. Furthermore, depending on the surgery, there may be certain unknown or unique risks attached depending on the cancer or surgical area. Additionally, undertaking a prophylactic surgery does not guarantee that the patient will never develop cancer later. Ultimately, it is a very complex and personal question when it comes to making the decision on whether to operate. Individuals whom do request prophylactic surgeries can be under the influence of anxiety, uncertainty and irrational fear as a result of a test or hereditary disease may incite these fears in the individual. It is important to consider the person's opinion, as well as those of their families and surgeon's first before committing to a prophylactic surgery.

== Prophylactic interventions in children ==
Prophylactic surgery in children has largely been justified through two grounds, the best interest of the child and public health. Since children are unlikely to be able to provide a meaningfully informed consent, it is an ethical subject discussed and heavily contested by various bioethics committees and the public.

== Primary, secondary and tertiary prevention ==
Depending on the situation, the type of prophylactic surgery performed may be relegated to match with relevant primary, secondary or tertiary preventive measures. A primary prevention's goal is to prevent a disease or injury before it has occurred, secondary prevention's goal is to minimize the effects of an illness after it has occurred, and tertiary prevention aims to manage the effects of an illness in the long term. Depending on the stage of the illness or whether the patient has had an illness, a different type of procedure may be required. If a cancer has not appeared already then a preventive surgery including the considerations of issues associated with metastatic breast cancer will not be considered, instead operations that conserve tissue can be discussed without considerations in case of metastasis and the patient may choose, under the context of breast cancer, may undergo a skin sparing or nipple sparing mastectomy instead of a total mastectomy.

== Types of prophylactic surgery ==
Mastectomies, especially under the context of cancer, are the most well-known form of prophylactic surgery, however there are still a multitude of other forms of surgery used to prevent other diseases. Prophylactic surgery is not only restricted to the prevention of cancer but can also include surgery whose intended purpose is to prevent any disease or unwanted consequence surgically. These can include prophylactic appendectomy, circumcision and even cosmetic surgeries as forms of prophylactic surgery. However, the terms usage is largely associated and most commonly interpreted as the prevention of cancer surgically. There are several examples and types of prophylactic surgery, for both cancer related and cancer unrelated diseases. In cancer related prophylactic surgeries, most individuals required to do these surgeries have either already been effected by a related cancer or have an inherited cancer. These hereditary cancer syndromes contribute to 5-10 percent of all cancers.

=== Cancer ===
==== Prophylactic mastectomy ====
Prophylactic mastectomy is the surgical removal of breast tissue to remove cells that are at risk of developing cancer. These are most commonly done in women whom have BRCA1 or BRCA2 mutations discovered from gene testing, have already had cancer in one breast, have a family history of breast cancer or have undergone radiation therapy to their chest, increasing their risk of developing breast cancer. Instances of post-surgery complications are common, with two-thirds of women experiencing at least one complication post-surgery. However, women whom have opted for simultaneous reconstruction after surgery have shown a slightly significant lower risk of complication at 64%.

==== Prophylactic salpingectomy ====
Prophylactic salpingectomy is the surgical removal of the Fallopian tube which, when done as a preventive measure, may be done to prevent pregnancies as a form of contraception, or as a method to prevent cancer. Women who underwent prophylactic salpingectomy have shown to have a lower incidence of ovarian cancer compared to women who have not undergone the procedure, from 2.2% to 13% and from 4.75% to 24.4%. Furthermore, it has been shown that a salpingectomy may reduce 29.2% to up to 64% of ovarian cancer incidents. For most women, it has been shown to have no significant effect on ovarian function, quality of life, sexuality, and its cost-effective profile.

==== Prophylactic oophorectomy ====
Prophylactic oophorectomy is the removal of the ovaries and is either done as a planned response to the genetic risk of ovarian or breast cancer, especially among women whom have a hereditary family history of ovarian cancer, have the BRCA1 or BRCA2 mutations, or have developed breast cancer in the past. Oophorectomy when done alongside salpingectomy as a bilateral salpingo-oophorectomy, or alongside hysterectomy or all together, have shown to significant decrease instances of ovarian cancer if the individual has a known history of BRCA1 or BRCA2 mutations and if they have an identified genetic risk of breast and ovarian cancer. However, hormone replacement therapy and less invasive methods of treating menorrhagia and fibroids have become more common, making prophylactic oophorectomy a less common choice in unaffected women without a hereditary history of breast or ovarian cancer.

==== Prophylactic Colectomy ====
Prophylactic Colectomy is the removal of part or all of the colon in an effort to prevent cancer in the colon. This is especially prevalent in individuals with hereditary colorectal cancer syndromes like hereditary non-polyposis colorectal cancer or familial adenomatous polyposis. Individuals affected by these inherited cancers can carry a risk of 80% up to nearly 100% in some cases within their lifetime. Prophylactic Colectomy have shown to greatly minimize this risk with minimal disturbance to the bowel.

==== Prophylactic Tonsillectomy ====
Prophylactic tonsillectomy is the removal of part or all of the tonsils as a prophylactic measure against future oropharyngeal carcinomas. However, current research is not definitive in regards to its effectiveness. Some research suggests the increase rates of oropharynx carcinomas in recent years is not due to decrease prophylactic tonsillectomy but increased HPV prevalence.

=== Non-cancer ===
==== Prophylactic appendectomy ====
Prophylactic appendectomy is the removal of the appendix in order to remove the chances of developing appendicitis as the leading cause of acute intra-abdominal disease in more than 50% of all cases. Prophylactic Appendectomy is one of the most common preventive surgeries and is the most common emergency surgery performed in the USA. The procedure is very safe when performed safely under optimal conditions with little to no adverse effects on the operated individuals.
