= BRCA mutation =

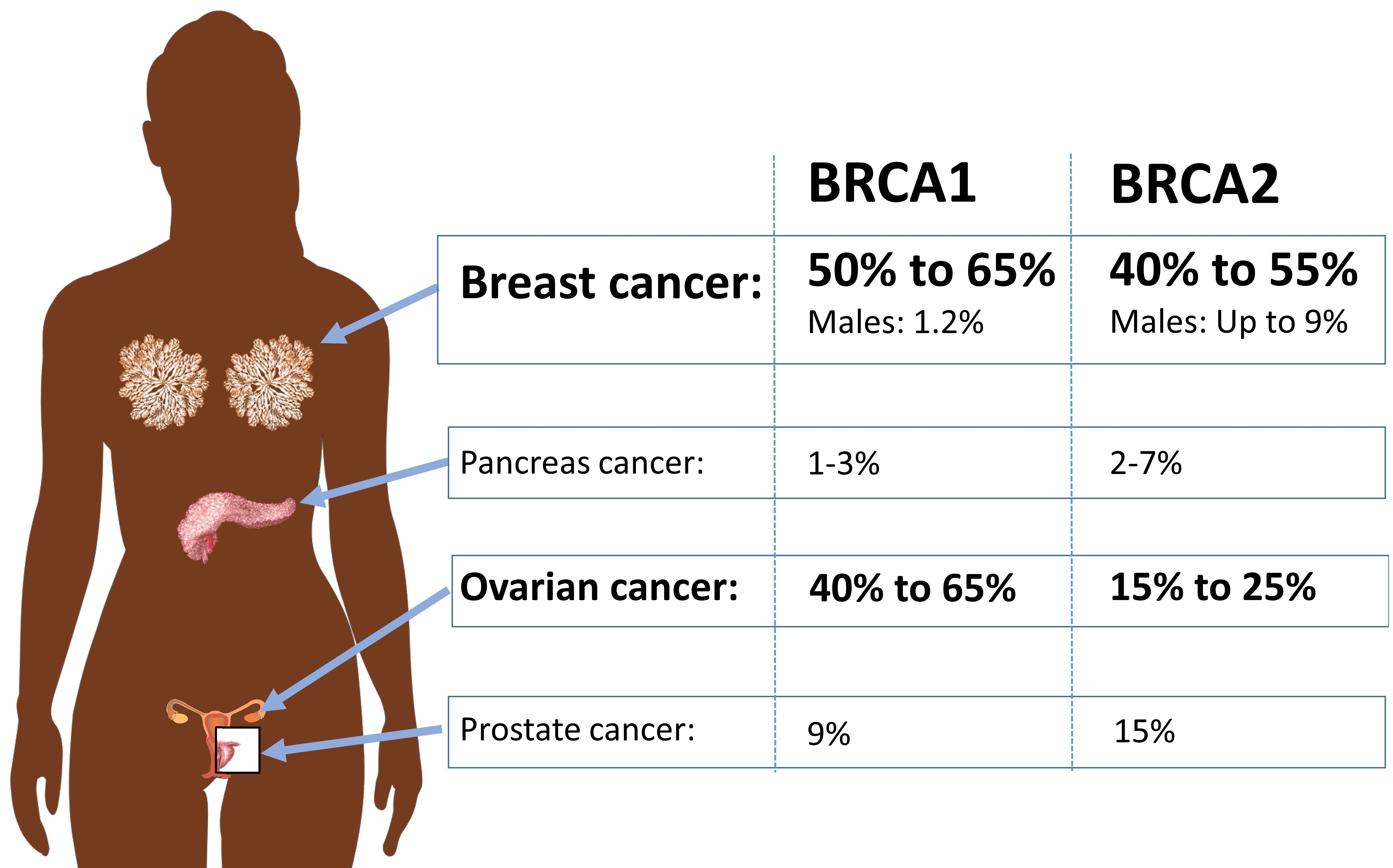
- Absolute risk of cancers in BRCA1 or BRCA2 mutation.
- Specialty: Medical genetics

A BRCA mutation is a mutation in either of the BRCA1 and BRCA2 genes, which are tumor suppressor genes. Hundreds of different types of mutations in these genes have been identified, some of which have been determined to be harmful, while others have no demonstrated deleterious effect. Harmful mutations in these genes may produce a hereditary breast–ovarian cancer syndrome. Women with harmful mutations in either BRCA1 or BRCA2 have a risk of breast cancer that is about five times higher than normal, and a risk of ovarian cancer that is about ten to thirty times normal. BRCA1 mutations are slightly more common than BRCA2 mutations, and the risk of breast and ovarian cancer is higher for women with a harmful BRCA1 mutation than with a BRCA2 mutation.

Harmful BRCA mutations, which disable an important DNA repair process, significantly increase a person's risk of developing certain cancers, especially cancers of the breast, ovaries, fallopian tubes, peritoneal tissue, prostate, and pancreas. Why BRCA1 and BRCA2 mutations lead preferentially to these types of cancers is not known, but dysfunction of the BRCA1 gene seems to lead to a disturbance in the normal process of inactivation of the X-chromosome. Not all mutations are deleterious; some appear to be harmless variations. The cancer risk associated with any given mutation varies significantly, depending on the exact type and location of the mutation, and possibly other individual factors.

BRCA mutations can be inherited from either parent and may be passed on to their children. Each child of a hereditary carrier, regardless of biological sex, has a 50% chance of inheriting the mutated gene from the parent who carries the mutation. As a result, half of the people with BRCA gene mutations are male, who may then pass the mutation on to 50% of their offspring, male or female. People who inherit two copies of a defective BRCA1 or BRCA2 gene rarely survive beyond birth, and those who do usually succumb to early-onset malignancies or bone marrow failure within the first few years of life.

== Health effects ==
=== Breast and ovarian cancer ===
Women with harmful mutations in either the BRCA1 or BRCA2 genes have a high risk of developing breast and/or ovarian cancer. Approximately 50% to 65% of women born with a harmful mutation in BRCA1 will develop breast cancer by age 70, and 35% to 46% will develop ovarian cancer by age 70. Approximately 40% to 57% of women with a harmful mutation in BRCA2 will develop breast cancer by age 70, and 13% to 23% will develop ovarian cancer by age 70. Women with a BRCA mutation have more than 100 times the normal rate of fallopian tube cancer. Age at menarche and age at menopause do not affect breast cancer risk for BRCA mutation carriers.

BRCA-related breast cancer appears at an earlier age than sporadic breast cancer (often about two decades earlier). BRCA1 mutations are associated with triple-negative breast cancer, which does not respond to hormonal therapy and is difficult to treat. BRCA2 mutations are more closely associated with post-menopausal breast cancer, although the risk of pre-menopausal breast cancer is significant. These cancers typically respond better to hormonal treatments.

BRCA-related ovarian and fallopian tube cancers are more treatable than average because they are unusually susceptible to platinum-based chemotherapy like cisplatin, as well as maintenance therapies such as PARP inhibitors. BRCA1-related ovarian cancer appears at younger ages, but the risk for women with BRCA2 climbs markedly at or shortly after menopause.

Among women who die before age 70...
- 72 / 100
- 46 / 100
- 11 / 100 72% of women with a BRCA1 mutation and 46% of women with a BRCA2 mutation (and no screening or medical interventions) who die before age 70 will die from breast or ovarian cancer. 11% of women in the US who die before age 70 will die from breast or ovarian cancer.

Likelihood of a 25-year-old woman surviving to age 70 (without screening or medical interventions to prevent cancer)
Group	Percentage surviving to age 70
BRCA1 mutation	59
BRCA2 mutation	71
Typical woman	84

A 25-year-old woman with no mutation in her BRCA genes has an 84% probability of reaching at least the age of 70. Of those not surviving, 11% die from either breast or ovarian cancer, and 89% from other causes. Compared to that, a woman with a high-risk BRCA1 mutation, if she had breast cancer screening but no prophylactic medical or surgical intervention, would have only a 59% chance to reach age 70, twenty-five percentage points lower than normal. Of those women not surviving, 26% would die of breast cancer, 46% ovarian cancer, and 28% other causes. Women with high-risk BRCA2 mutations, with screening but with no prophylactic medical or surgical intervention, would have only a 71% chance to reach age 70, thirteen percentage points lower than normal. Of those not surviving, 21% would die of breast cancer, 25% ovarian cancer, and 54% other causes. The likelihood of surviving to at least age 70 can be improved by certain medical interventions, such as prophylactic mastectomy and oophorectomy.

=== Male breast cancer ===
Approximately half of the men who develop breast cancer have a mutation in a BRCA gene or one of the other genes associated with hereditary breast–ovarian cancer syndromes. Men with a BRCA mutation have a dramatically elevated relative risk of developing breast cancer, but because the overall incidence of breast cancer in men is so low, the absolute risk is equal to or lower than the risk for women without a BRCA mutation. Approximately 1% to 2% of men with a BRCA1 mutation will develop breast cancer by age 70. Approximately 6% of men with a BRCA2 mutation will develop breast cancer by age 70, which is approximately equal to the risk for women without a BRCA mutation. Very few men, with or without a predisposing mutation, develop breast cancer before age 50. Men with a BRCA mutation may benefit from professional and self-examination. Because male BRCA2 carriers have a risk of breast cancer that is very similar to the general female population, the standard annual mammogram program can be adapted to these high-risk men.

=== Other cancers ===
BRCA mutations are associated with an increased risk of developing other types of cancer, including stomach cancer, pancreatic cancer, prostate cancer, and colorectal cancer.

Men with BRCA mutations may be twice as likely as non-carriers to develop prostate cancer at a younger age. The risk is smaller and disputed for BRCA1 carriers; up to one-third of BRCA2 mutation carriers are expected to develop prostate cancer before age 65. Prostate cancer in BRCA mutation carriers tends to appear a decade earlier than normal, and it tends to be more aggressive than normal. As a result, annual prostate screening, including a digital rectal examination, is appropriate at age 40 among known carriers, rather than age 50.

Pancreatic cancer tends to run in families, even among BRCA families. A BRCA1 mutation approximately doubles or triples the lifetime risk of developing pancreatic cancer; a BRCA2 mutation triples to quintuples it. Between 4% and 7% of people with pancreatic cancer have a BRCA mutation. However, since pancreatic cancer is relatively rare, people with a BRCA2 mutation probably face an absolute risk of about 5%. Like ovarian cancer, it tends not to produce symptoms in the early, treatable stages. Like prostate cancer, pancreatic cancer associated with a BRCA mutation tends to appear about a decade earlier than non-hereditary cases. Asymptomatic screening is invasive and may be recommended only to BRCA2 carriers who also have a family history of pancreatic cancer.

Melanoma is the most deadly skin cancer, although it is easily cured in the early stages. The normal likelihood of developing melanoma depends on skin type, the number of moles the person has, family history, age, sex, and how much the person has been exposed to UV radiation. BRCA2 mutation carriers have approximately double or triple the risk that they would normally have, including a higher than average risk of melanoma of the eye.

Colorectal cancer is approximately as common in both men and women in the developed world as breast cancer is among average-risk women, with about 6% of people being diagnosed with it, usually over the age of 50. Like sporadic prostate cancer, it is a multifactorial disease, and is affected by age, diet, and similar factors. BRCA mutation carriers have a higher than average risk of this common cancer, but the risk is not as high as in some other hereditary cancers. The risk might be as high as four times normal in some BRCA1 families, and double the normal risk among BRCA2 carriers. Like pancreatic cancer, it may be that only some BRCA mutations or some BRCA families have the extra risk; unlike other BRCA-caused cancers, it does not appear at an earlier age than usual. Normal colon cancer screening is usually recommended to BRCA mutation carriers.

Mutations in BRCA1 and BRCA2 are strongly implicated in some hematological malignancies. BRCA1 mutations are associated acute myelogenous leukemia and chronic myelogenous leukemia. Mutations of BRCA2 are also found in many T-cell lymphomas and chronic lymphocytic leukemias.

=== Childbearing ===
There is likely little or no effect of a BRCA gene mutation on overall fertility, although women with a BRCA mutation may be more likely to have primary ovarian insufficiency. BRCA mutation carriers may be more likely to give birth to girls than boys, however this observation has been attributed to ascertainment bias.

If both parents are carriers of a BRCA mutation, then pre-implantation genetic diagnosis is sometimes used to prevent the birth of a child with BRCA mutations. Inheriting two BRCA1 mutations (one from each parent) has never been reported and is believed to be a lethal birth defect. Inheriting one BRCA1 mutation and one BRCA2 mutation has been reported occasionally; the child's risk for any given type of cancer is the higher risk of the two genes (e.g., the ovarian cancer risk from BRCA1 and the pancreatic cancer risk from BRCA2). Inheriting two BRCA2 mutations is associated with Fanconi anemia.

In the absence of BRCA mutations, each pregnancy in genetically typical women is associated with a significant reduction in the mother's risk of developing both breast and ovarian cancer. The younger the woman is at the time of her first birth, the more protection against breast cancer she receives. Breastfeeding for more than one year protects against breast cancer. Women with BRCA mutations are generally not expected to receive these significant protective benefits. Current research is too limited and imprecise to permit calculation of specific risks. However, the following general trends have been identified:

- For women with a BRCA1 mutation, the woman's age when she first gives birth has no association with her risk of breast cancer. Childbearing does not protect against breast cancer, unless the woman has five or more full-term pregnancies, at which point she receives only modest protection. Similar to genetically typical women, pregnancy protects against ovarian cancer in BRCA1 women. Breastfeeding for more than one year significantly protects against breast cancer. This effect may be as high as 19% per year of breastfeeding, which is much higher than that seen among genetically typical women. The effect, if any, of long-term breastfeeding on ovarian cancer is unclear.
- For women with a BRCA2 mutation, each pregnancy is paradoxically associated with a statistically significant increase in the risk for breast cancer. Unlike genetically typical women or women with BRCA1 mutations, breastfeeding has no effect on either cancer in women with BRCA2 mutations. Limited and conflicting data suggest that, also unlike other women, pregnancy does not reduce ovarian cancer risk significantly in women with a BRCA2 mutation and might increase it.

== Genetics ==
BRCA mutations are inherited in a genetically dominant fashion, from either parent

The BRCA genes are tumour suppressor genes pictured here on their respective chromosomes. BRCA 1 has the cytogenetic location 17q21 or the q arm of Chromosome 17 at position 21. BRCA 2 has the cytogenetic location 13q12.3 or the q arm of Chromosome 13 at position 12.3. Both genes produce proteins that help repair damaged DNA, keeping the genetic material of the cell stable. A damaged BRCA gene in either location can lead to increased risk of cancer, particularly breast or ovarian in women.

Both BRCA genes are tumor suppressor genes that produce proteins that are used by the cell in a metabolic pathway that makes precise repairs to damaged DNA molecules. The pathway requires proteins produced by several other genes, including CHEK2, FANCD2 and ATM. Harmful mutations in any of these genes disable the gene or cause it to encode for a dysfunctional protein.

The cancer risk caused by BRCA1 and BRCA2 mutations are inherited in a dominant fashion even though usually only one mutated allele is directly inherited. This is because people with the mutation are likely to acquire a second mutation, leading to dominant expression of the cancer. A mutated BRCA gene can be inherited from either parent. Because they are inherited from the parents, they are classified as hereditary or germline mutations rather than acquired or somatic mutations. Cancer caused by a mutated gene inherited from an individual's parents is a hereditary cancer rather than a sporadic cancer.

Because humans have a diploid genome, each cell has two copies of the gene (one from each biological parent). Typically, only one copy contains a disabling, inherited mutation, so the affected person is heterozygous for the mutation. If the functional copy is harmed, however, then the cell is forced to use alternate DNA repair mechanisms, which are more error-prone. The loss of the functional copy is called loss of heterozygosity (LOH). Any resulting errors in DNA repair may result in cell death or a cancerous transformation of the cell.

There are many variations in the BRCA genes, and not all changes confer the same risks. Some variants are harmless; others are known to be very harmful. Some single-nucleotide polymorphisms may confer only a small risk, or may only confer risk in the presence of other mutations or under certain circumstances. In other cases, whether the variant is harmful is unknown. Variants are classified as follows:

- Deleterious mutation: The change is proven to cause significant risks. Often, these are frameshift mutations that prevent the cell from producing more than the first part of the necessary protein.
- Suspected deleterious: While nothing is proven, the variation is currently believed to be harmful.
- Variant of uncertain significance (VUS): Whether the change has any effect is uncertain. This is a common test result, and most variations began in this category. As more evidence is acquired, these are reclassified.
- Variant, favor polymorphism: While nothing is proven, the variation is currently believed to be harmless.
- Benign polymorphism: The change is classified as harmless. These may be reported as "no mutation".

Deleterious mutations have high, but not complete, genetic penetrance, which means that people with the mutation have a high risk of developing disease as a result, but that some people will not develop cancer despite carrying a harmful mutation.

Reports of patients biallelic or homozygous for a deleterious BRCA allele conferring a greatly increased risk of breast cancer are rare. This is because deleterious BRCA alleles are lethal alleles; this condition is embryonically lethal in the majority of cases. For live cases, inheriting both mutations leads to a grave prognosis, characterized by Wilms tumors, leukemias, and early-onset brain malignancies.

== Diagnosis ==
Two types of tests are available. Both commonly use a blood sample, although testing can be done on saliva. The quickest, simplest, and lowest cost test uses positive test results from a blood relative and checks only for the single mutation that is known to be present in the family. If no relative has previously disclosed positive test results, then a full test that checks the entire sequence of both BRCA1 and BRCA2 can be performed. In some cases, because of the founder effect, Jewish ethnicity can be used to narrow the testing to quickly check for the three most common mutations seen among Ashkenazi Jews.

Testing is ordered by a physician and usually covered by health insurance and public healthcare programs for people at high risk for having a mutation, and not covered for people at low risk. The purpose of limiting the testing to high-risk people is to increase the likelihood that the person will receive a meaningful, actionable result from the test, rather than identifying a variant of unknown significance (VUS). In Canada, people who demonstrate their high-risk status by meeting specified guidelines are referred initially to a specialized program for hereditary cancers, and, if they choose to be tested, the cost of the test is fully covered. In the US in 2010, single-site testing had a retail cost of US$400 to $500, and full-length analysis cost about $3,000 per gene, and the costs were commonly covered by private health insurance for people deemed to be at high risk.

A positive test result for a known deleterious mutation is proof of a predisposition, although it does not guarantee that the person will develop any type of cancer. A negative test result, if a specific mutation is known to be present in the family, shows that the person does not have a BRCA-related predisposition for cancer, although it does not guarantee that the person will not develop a non-hereditary case of cancer. By itself, a negative test result does not mean that the patient has no hereditary predisposition for breast or ovarian cancer. The family may have some other genetic predisposition for cancer, involving some other gene.

Genetic counseling is recommended in women whose personal or family health history suggests a greater than average likelihood of a mutation. The purpose of genetic counseling is to educate the person about the likelihood of a positive result, the risks and benefits of being tested, the limitations of the tests, the practical meaning of the results, and the risk-reducing actions that could be taken if the results are positive. They are also trained to support people through any emotional reactions and to be a neutral person who helps the client make his or her own decision in an informed consent model, without pushing the client to do what the counselor might do. Because the knowledge of a mutation can produce substantial anxiety, some people choose not to be tested or to postpone testing until a later date.

Relative indications for testing for a mutation in BRCA1 or BRCA2 for newly diagnosed or family members include a family history among first (FDR), second (SDR), or third (TDR) degree relatives usually on the same side of the family but not limited:

- A known mutation (BRCA1 or BRCA2) in a cancer susceptibility gene within the family
- Women affected by any breast cancer diagnosed under the age of 30
- Women affected by triple negative breast cancer (TNBC) (estrogen receptor negative, progesterone receptor negative, and HER2/neu negative) under the age of 50
- Two relatives (FDR/SDR) diagnosed under the age of 45
- Three relatives (FDR/SDR) diagnosed with an average age of 50 or less
- Four relatives of any age
- Ovarian cancer with either an additional diagnosed relative or a relative with male breast cancer
- A single family member with both breast and ovarian cancer
- Male breast cancer
- Pancreatic cancer with breast or ovarian cancer in the same individual or on the same side of the family
- Ashkenazi Jewish, Filipino, or Polish ancestry with one FDR family member affected by breast or ovarian cancer at any age

Testing young children is considered medically unethical because the test results would not change the way the child's health is cared for. BRCA testing for minors is reserved for when they become old enough to engage in cancer prevention mechanisms. Parents with BRCA mutations often struggle with sharing their inherent risk of developing cancer at some point in their lifetime. Many fear that their child will experience increased fear and anxiety regarding their parents’s health and their own health. Tailoring this conversation to the child’s age and maturity level, while also keeping the goals of this conversation in mind may make it more meaningful and effective, rather than inducing fear or worry. Genetic counseling professionals can help by advising when children should be tested or begin preventative measures, distinguishing between relevant and irrelevant information to share with others, providing psychological and educational resources, communicating information to at-risk individuals, or explaining results to individuals in an accessible manner.

=== Psychological implications of BRCA genetic testing ===
The increased risk of developing different types of cancer due to a positive BRCA result can be very psychologically distressing for some individuals. Genetic counseling is often required before and after undergoing testing, regardless of the result, but often does not follow patients longitudinally. As genetic testing becomes more common place, more genetic counseling resources may be necessary in order to reduce the psychological distress that occurs in individuals. Some types of psychosocial resources used in genetic counseling include educational pamphlets and modules using medically-accessible language, decision-making aids, visual educational aids, or home-based counseling. Anxiety is one of the most common psychosocial concerns regarding genetic testing, with many patients reporting fear of developing cancer. Even after negative results for the BRCA mutation, many individuals still struggle with the same level of pre-test anxiety. Following genetic testing, individuals with results showing that they are carriers experienced increased psychological distress, especially compared to their non-carrier counterparts. Genetic counseling has been found to reduce cancer-specific anxiety and depression while also increasing understanding of risk.

== Cancer prevention in people with BRCA mutations ==
=== Screening ===
A variety of cancer screening methods are available to detect the presence and reduce the risk of cancer in people with BRCA mutations. An intensive screening regimen is usually advised for women with deleterious BRCA mutations to detect new cancers as early as possible. A typical recommendation includes frequent breast cancer screening as well as tests to detect ovarian cancer.

Breast imaging studies usually include a breast MRI (magnetic resonance imaging) once a year, beginning between the ages of 20 and 30, depending on the age at which any relatives were diagnosed with breast cancer. Mammograms are typically used only at advanced age, as there is reason to believe that BRCA carriers are more susceptible to breast cancer induction by X-ray damage than the general population.

Alternatives include breast ultrasonography, CT scans, PET scans, scintimammography, elastography, thermography, ductal lavage, and experimental screening protocols, some of which hope to identify biomarkers for breast cancer (molecules that appear in the blood when breast cancer begins).

Ovarian cancer screening usually involves ultrasonography of the pelvic region, typically twice a year. Women may also use a blood test for CA-125 and clinical pelvic exams. The blood test has relatively poor sensitivity and specificity for ovarian cancer.

In both breast and ovarian screening, areas of tissue that look suspicious are investigated with either more imaging, possibly using a different type of imaging, or after a delay, or with biopsies of the suspicious areas.

=== Medication ===
Birth control pills are associated with substantially lower risk of ovarian cancer in women with BRCA mutations. A 2013 meta-analysis found that oral contraceptive use was associated with a 42% reduction of the relative risk of ovarian cancer, the association was similar for BRCA1 and BRCA2 mutations. Use of oral contraceptives was not significantly associated with breast cancer risk, although a small increase in risk that did not reach statistical significance was observed. A 2011 meta-analysis found that OC use was associated with a 43% relative reduction in risk of ovarian cancer in women with BRCA mutations, while data on the risk of breast cancer in BRCA mutation carriers with oral contraceptive use were heterogeneous and results were inconsistent.

Selective estrogen receptor modulators, specifically tamoxifen, have been found to reduce breast cancer risk in women with BRCA mutations who do not have their breasts removed. It is effective as for primary prevention (preventing the first case of breast cancer) in women with BRCA2 mutations, but not BRCA1 mutations, and for secondary prevention (preventing a second, independent breast cancer) in both groups of women. Taking tamoxifen for five years has been found to halve the breast cancer risk in women who have a high risk of breast cancer for any reason, but potentially serious adverse effects like cataracts, blood clots, and endometrial cancer, along with quality of life issues like hot flashes, result in some women discontinuing its use and some physicians limiting its use to women with atypical growths in the breasts. Tamoxifen is contraindicated for women who are most likely to be harmed by the common complications. Raloxifene (Evista), which has a reduced risk of side effects, is used as an alternative, but it has not been studied in BRCA mutation carriers specifically. Tamoxifen use can be combined with oophorectomy for even greater reduction of breast cancer risk, particularly in women with BRCA2 mutations.

Aromatase inhibitors are medications that prevent estrogen production in the adrenal glands and adipose tissue. They have fewer side effects than selective estrogen receptor modulators like tamoxifen, but do not work in premenopausal women, because they do not prevent the ovaries from producing estrogen.

=== Surgery ===
Preventive surgery can substantially reduce the risk of cancer in women with harmful BRCA mutations. Surgery may be used alone or in combination with non-surgical interventions to reduce the risk of cancer.

Tubal ligation is the least invasive of these operations, and appears to reduce ovarian cancer risk for BRCA1 carriers by over 60%. Salpingectomy is a more invasive option than tubal ligation that may result in additional risk reduction. Prophylactic salpingo-oophorectomy (removal of the ovaries and fallopian tubes) results in a substantial reduction in ovarian cancer risk, and a large reduction in breast cancer risk if performed before natural menopause. Hysterectomy has no direct effect on BRCA-related cancers, but it enables women to use some medications that reduce breast cancer risk (such as tamoxifen) with the risk of uterine cancer and to use fewer hormones to manage the adverse effects of a prophylactic oophorectomy.

==== Mastectomy ====
Techniques for prophylactic mastectomy include:

- Simple mastectomy, which is recommended for women not having breast reconstruction, leaves the least amount of breast tissue in the body and therefore achieves the greatest risk reduction. In addition to prophylactic use, it is also used by women who have been diagnosed with earlier stages of cancer.
- Skin-sparing mastectomy removes the tissue of the breast, nipple, and areola, but leaves the "excess" skin in place for reconstruction. It has less visible scar tissue than a simple mastectomy.
- Nipple-sparing mastectomy removes the breast tissue, but leaves the nipple and the areola intact for a more natural appearance.
- Subcutaneous mastectomy removes the breast tissue, but leaves the nipple and areola intact. The scars are hidden in the inframammary fold under the breast.
- Areola-sparing mastectomy removes the breast tissue and the nipple, but not the areola.
- Nerve-sparing mastectomy is an effort to maintain the nerves that provide sensation to the skin over the breasts. Breasts that have undergone any of these surgeries have much less tactile sensation than natural breasts. Nerve-sparing techniques are an effort to retain some feeling in the breasts, with limited and often only partial success.

Which technique is used is determined by the existence of any cancer and overall health, as well as by the woman's desire, if any, for breast reconstruction surgery for aesthetic purposes. Women who choose a flat-chested appearance or use external breast prostheses typically choose simple mastectomy, with its greater risk reduction.

Breast reconstruction is usually done by a plastic surgeon, and may be started as part of the same multi-hour surgery that removes the breasts. There are multiple techniques for breast reconstruction. Some techniques use tissue from another part of the body, such as fat tissue from the lower abdomen or occasionally muscles from other parts of the torso. Others use breast implants, possibly preceded by tissue expanders, to provide volume. Some reconstruction techniques require multiple surgeries. Afterwards, some women have tattoos added to simulate breast areolas or have the skin reshaped to form a nipple.

==== Salpingo-oophorectomy ====
Salpingo-oophorectomy (surgical removal of the ovaries and fallopian tubes) is the single most effective method of preventing ovarian and fallopian tube cancer in women with BRCA mutations. For women with harmful BRCA1 mutations, many medical organizations — including the National Comprehensive Cancer Network (NCCN) — recommend undergoing risk-reducing bilateral salpingo-oophorectomy (RRSO) between the ages of 35 and 40. For those with BRCA2 mutations, the recommended age is between 45 and 50.

RRSO is often done in conjunction with a hysterectomy (surgical removal of the uterus), especially in women who want to take tamoxifen, which is known to increase the risk of uterine cancer, or who have uterine fibroids. Women who wish to have children sometimes choose to freeze their eggs prior to undergoing RRSO and have a gestational carrier carry the child on their behalf.

Because about 5% of women with a BRCA mutation have undetected ovarian cancer at the time of their planned surgery, RRSO is conducted as if it were a removal of a known cancer. However, a small risk of primary peritoneal carcinoma remains, at least among women with BRCA1 mutations, since the peritoneal lining is the same type of cells as parts of the ovary. This risk is estimated to produce about five cases of peritoneal cancer per 100 women with harmful BRCA1 mutations in the 20 years after RRSO.

Some sources assert that oophorectomy before age 50 increases the risk of cardiovascular disease and also the risk of hip fractures caused by osteoporosis. Salpingo-oophorectomy also induces menopause, which may be accompanied by unpleasant symptoms such as hot flashes, sleep disturbances, mood swings, and vaginal dryness. Many women with a BRCA mutation take hormone replacement therapy to reduce these effects. Estrogen can increase the risk of breast cancer, but as the amount of estrogen taken is less than the amount produced by the now-removed ovaries, the net risk is usually judged to be acceptable.

=== Non-medical choices ===
Certain lifestyle choices influence the risk of cancer in people with BRCA mutations. For example, obesity and weight gain as an adult and the consumption of alcoholic beverages are all associated with an increased risk of developing breast cancer. Carriers are usually encouraged to consume no more than one alcoholic drink per day, and no more than four in a week.

In women with a BRCA mutation, being physically active and having had a healthy body weight as an adolescent does not affect the incidence of ovarian cancer and delays the onset of breast cancer after menopause.

Having children appears to provide little or no protection against breast cancer for women with BRCA1 mutations, and appears to increase the risk of breast cancer for women with BRCA2 mutations. (See #Childbearing for a discussion on ovarian cancer rates.)

== Patents ==
A patent application for the clinical screening test for BRCA1 gene mutations was filed by Myriad Genetics, the University of Utah Research Foundation, and the United States Department of Health and Human Services in 1995, and the screening test for BRCA2 gene mutations was patented in 1996. High prices for testing and the inability to get second opinions from other diagnostic labs led to a lawsuit that was ultimately resolved by a decision of the Supreme Court of the United States in 2013. Both of the patents expired in 2015.

== See also ==
- Medical genetics of Jews
