= Triple-negative breast cancer =

Type of breast cancer lacking certain gene expressions

Triple-negative breast cancer (TNBC) is any breast cancer that either lacks or shows low levels of estrogen receptor (ER), progesterone receptor (PR) and human epidermal growth factor receptor 2 (HER2) overexpression and/or gene amplification (i.e. the tumor is negative on all three tests, giving it the name triple-negative). Triple-negative is sometimes used as a surrogate term for basal-like.

Triple-negative breast cancer comprises 15–20% of all breast cancer cases and affects more women with a mutation in the BRCA1 gene than other breast cancers. Triple-negative breast cancers comprise a very heterogeneous group of cancers. TNBC is the most challenging breast cancer type to treat. Hormone therapy that is used for other breast cancers does not work for TNBC. In its early stages, the cancer is typically treated through surgery, radiation and chemotherapy. In later stages where surgery is not possible or the cancer has spread from the initial localised area, treatment is limited to chemotherapy and in some cases further targeted therapy.

Triple-negative breast cancers have a relapse pattern that is very different from hormone-positive breast cancers; the triple-negatives have a risk of relapse much higher for the first 3–5 years, but this drops sharply and substantially below that of hormone-positive breast cancers afterwards.

== Risk factors ==
The overall proportion of TNBC is very similar in all age groups. Younger women have a higher rate of basal or BRCA related TNBC, while older women have a higher proportion of apocrine, normal-like and rare subtypes including neuroendocrine TNBC.

A study in the US has shown that, among younger women, African American and Hispanic women have a higher risk of TNBC, with African Americans facing worse prognosis when diagnosed later than other ethnic groups.

One known risk factor for triple-negative breast cancer is germline mutations. These are alterations within the heritable lineage that is being passed down to the offspring. Due to their high disposition for cancers of the breast, ovaries, pancreas, and prostate, the BRCA1 and BRCA2 genes were identified as high risk for triple-negative. Changes or mutations in 19p13.1 and MDM4 loci have also been associated with triple-negative breast cancer, but not other forms of breast cancer. Thus, triple-negative tumors may be distinguished from other breast cancer subtypes by a unique pattern of common and rare germline alterations.

In 2009, a case-control study of 187 triple-negative breast cancer patients described a 2.5-fold higher risk for triple-negative breast cancer in women who used oral contraceptives (OCs) for more than one year, compared to women who used OCs for less than one year or never. This risk was more pronounced among women aged 40 years old or younger where the relative risk for triple-negative breast cancer rose to 4.2 who used OCs for more than one year, while there was no increased risk for women between the ages of 41 and 45. Also, as duration of OC use increased, triple-negative breast cancer risk increased.

== Classification ==
Breast cancer classification is used to assess the tumor to decide on treatment and prognosis. Classification can be performed using molecular, immunohistochemical, and clinical characteristics. One of the important classification types is receptor status, because it identifies those cancers that have specific targeted treatments available. Breast cancer tumors have traditionally been classed using immunohistochemistry as one of four types:

- estrogen receptor positive
- progesterone receptor positive
- HER2 overexpression positive
- triple-negative

There are targeted therapies for estrogen and progesterone receptor cancers and more recently HER2 receptor cancers but there are no targeted therapies for TNBC as a whole.

The threshold level for hormone receptor positivity was changed in 2010 and now requires more than 1% positive tumor nuclei are found in the tumor sample.

Newer techniques for categorising breast cancer are based on gene expression in the tumor which classifies breast cancer into:

- luminal A (HR+/HER2-) 68%
- luminal B (HR+/HER2+) 10%
- HER2 overexpressing (HR-/HER2+) 4%
- basal-like (HR-/HER2-) 10%

with 7% of unknown subtype. HR indicates hormone receptor and +/- indicates status whether positive or negative.

The basal-like subtype has many overlapping features to TNBC and in addition to being receptor negative, has increased expression of basal cytokeratins. 85% of basal-like tumors are TNBC.

Subtypes are used to try to define better treatments or a more accurate prognosis. However, there is no standard classification for TNBC subtypes. Although TNBC has a variety of different subtypes that may vary depending on how they are determined, to date the disease is still uniformly treated with chemotherapy although they may have additional targeted treatments. One of the popular subtype classification for TNBC is:

- basal-like 1 (BL1) 35%
- basal-like 2 (BL2) 22%
- mesenchymal (M) 25%
- luminal androgen receptor (LAR) 16%

Most of TNBC is invasive carcinoma of no special type. The following rarer breast tumors have a higher proportion of being TNBC:

- adenoid cystic carcinoma 78.2% are TNBC
- metaplastic 76.2% are TNBC
- medullary carcinoma 60.5% are TNBC
- apocrine adenocarcinoma 56.7% are TNBC
- inflammatory 25.9% are TNBC

== Prognosis ==
TNBC is more likely to recur within the first five years after treatment than other breast cancers. However, after five years the chance of recurrence is much less than for other breast cancers. The risk of recurrence peaks at three years from diagnosis and reduces after that.

Cancer survival is typically based on 5-year survival rates which is the survival rate compared to women without breast cancer and is based on the stage when the cancer is first diagnosed. These statistics do not apply if the cancer returns after treatment.

Survival rates for Triple-negative breast cancer from time of diagnosis
stage	5-year survival
Localised	91%
Regional	65%
Distant	12%
All stages	77%

Approximately 25% of those with localised disease will relapse with distant metastasis also known as stage IV. Median survival from diagnosis of metastasis is around 12 months. Metastasis in TNBC is different from other breast cancers, with a tendency to spread to the brain and other organs such as the lungs and liver and less of a tendency to spread to the bones.

== Treatment ==
=== Early stage disease ===
Standard treatment is surgery with adjuvant chemotherapy and radiotherapy.

Surgery is primarily used for early stage disease and may be either a lumpectomy or a mastectomy. Studies have found that the overall survival for lumpectomy and radiotherapy was the same or higher than for a mastectomy for TNBC patients.

Neoadjuvant chemotherapy (before surgery) is very frequently used for triple-negative breast cancers as they are more susceptible to platinum-based regimen, allowing for a higher rate of breast-conserving surgeries. Important details on the individual responsiveness of particular cancers can be gained from evaluating the response to this form of chemotherapy. However, the improvement in breast conservation is only 10–15% and the clues to individual responsiveness have conclusively proven to make an improvement in outcomes.

Early stage TNBC is generally very susceptible to chemotherapy and can lead to a pathological complete response (pCR) i.e. no detectable cancer cells in the breast or lymph nodes. Although this does not always translate into overall survival.

Chemotherapy used to treat early stage cancers are:

- anthracyclines
- alkylating agents such as cisplatin and carboplatin. These are particularly effective with BRCA positive cases. These agents cause DNA damage which is unable to be repaired when there are BRCA defects leading to cell death.
- taxanes

=== Late stage disease ===
Late stage disease is known as metastatic TNBC (mTNBC).

Treatment depends on whether the tumour tests positive for the programmed death cell ligand 1 (PD-L1) protein or BRCA gene mutation. Also known as immunotherapy the presence of PD-L1 on cancer cells mates with an associate PD-1 receptor on the bodies own immune killer T cells which prevents the T cell from further attacking the cancer cell. By blocking these receptors the T-cells can attack both cancer cells and healthy cells.

The following treatment is recommended by the American Society of Clinical Oncology (ASCO) for metastatic TNBC:

- mTNBC +PD-L1: 1st line: offered chemo + immune checkpoint inhibitor
- mTNBC -PD-L1: 1st line: single-agent chemo; 3rd line: sacituzumab govitecan
- mTNBC +BRCA: patients previously treated with chemotherapy in the neoadjuvant, adjuvant, or metastatic disease should be offered PARP inhibitor rather than chemotherapy.

Sacituzumab govitecan (Trodelvy) is an anti-Trop-2 antibody linked to SN-38, developed by Immunomedics Inc. (now Gilead Sciences). It was approved by the FDA on 22 April 2020 for the treatment of metastatic TNBC. Sacituzumab govitecan had previously received FDA priority review, breakthrough therapy, and fast track designations.

Sacituzumab govitecan utilizes the moderately toxic payload SN-38 with a high drug-to-antibody ratio (DAR) of approximately 8, which contributes to its efficacy. However, the drug has a relatively short half-life and some plasma instability. To address this, a next-generation Trop2-ADC, datopotamab deruxtecan (DS-1062a), has been developed, which uses the more potent topoisomerase I inhibitor payload Deruxtecan linked via a highly stable maleimide linker, allowing for improved plasma stability and a broader therapeutic window. It is currently being evaluated in trials for metastatic TNBC and other solid tumors.

On May 22, 2026, the FDA approved Datroway (datopotamab deruxtecan-dlnk) for adult patients with unresectable or metastatic triple-negative breast cancer who are not candidates for PD-1 or PD-L1 inhibitor therapy.

== Clinical trials ==
Angiogenesis and EGFR (HER-1) inhibitors are frequently tested in experimental settings and have shown efficacy. Treatment modalities are not sufficiently established for normal use, and it is unclear in which stage they are best used and which patients would profit.

By 2009 a number of new strategies for TNBC were being tested in clinical trials, including the PARP inhibitor BSI 201, NK012.

A novel antibody-drug conjugate known as glembatumumab vedotin (CDX-011), which targets the protein GPNMB, has also shown encouraging clinical trial results in 2009.

PARP inhibitors had shown some promise in early trials but failed in some later trials.

An accelerated approval Phase II clinical trial (METRIC) investigating glembatumumab vedotin versus capecitabine began in November 2013, expected to enroll 300 patients with GPNMB-expressing metastatic TNBC.

Three early stage trials reported TNBC results in June 2016, for IMMU-132, Vantictumab, and atezolizumab in combination with the chemotherapy nab-paclitaxel.

In 2019, CytoDyn initiated a Phase 1b/2 trial with its humanized monoclonal antibody, leronlimab (PRO 140), in combination with chemotherapy following strong results in animal murine models. Among other mechanisms of action, leronlimab is believed to inhibit metastasis by inhibiting the CCR5 receptor on cell surfaces, which is commonly expressed in triple-negative breast cancer. On November 11, 2019, CytoDyn reported that the first TNBC patient injected under its naïve protocol (not previously treated for triple-negative breast cancer) demonstrated significantly reduced levels of circulating tumor cells (CTCs) and decreased tumor size at two-week and five-week observation intervals compared to baseline observations. CTCs are a potential surrogate endpoint in oncology trials, with reduced levels suggesting long-term clinical benefit.

As of 2022 a combination of ostarine, a selective androgen receptor modulator, and sabizabulin is under investigation in a phase II trial.

== Research ==
Triple-negative breast cancers (TNBC) have, on average, significantly higher fluorine-18 fluorodeoxyglucose (FDG) uptake (measured by the SUVmax values) compared with uptake in ER+/PR+/HER2- tumors using fluorine-18 fluorodeoxyglucose-positron emission tomography (FDG-PET). It is speculated that enhanced glycolysis in these tumors is probably related to their aggressive biology. Galectin-1 in TNBC is a beta-galactosidase-binding protein that shields cancer cells from the effects of radiotherapy by suppressing anti-tumor doxorubicin-induced apoptosis, and since this immunosuppression mechanism is higher in TNBC than in other cancer, Gal-1 has shown promise as a therapeutic marker of TNBC.

Another therapeutic marker of TNBC examines T-regulatory cells (Treg) and the presence of CCR2-positive Treg causing a decrease in CD8-positive cytotoxic T-cell activation resulting in promotion of tumor growth and metastasis as the tumor microenvironment is infiltrated with Treg.

The widely used diabetes drug metformin holds promise for the treatment of triple-negative breast cancer. In addition metformin may influence cancer cells through indirect (insulin-mediated) effects, or it may directly affect cell proliferation and apoptosis of cancer cells. Epidemiologic and preclinical lab studies indicate that metformin has anti-tumor effects, via at least two mechanisms, both involving activation of the AMP-activated protein kinase (AMPK). A large-scale phase III trial of metformin in the adjuvant breast cancer setting is being planned in 2009.

Triple-negative breast cancer cells rely on glutathione-S-transferase Pi1, and an inhibitor (LAS17) shows encouraging results in a pre-clinical study.

Recently, BET (Bromodomain and Extra-Terminal Domain Proteins) inhibitors have shown anti-tumor activity in pre-clinical models of Triple Negative Breast Cancer.

Investigational work has explored whether genomic predictors of radiosensitivity can guide personalized radiation dosing in TNBC. One proposed approach, the genomic-adjusted radiation dose Genomic Adjusted Radiation Dose (GARD) model, integrates tumor gene-expression signatures to estimate individualized radiation effect.

== See also ==
- Triple Negative Breast Cancer Foundation
