= Primary peritoneal carcinoma =

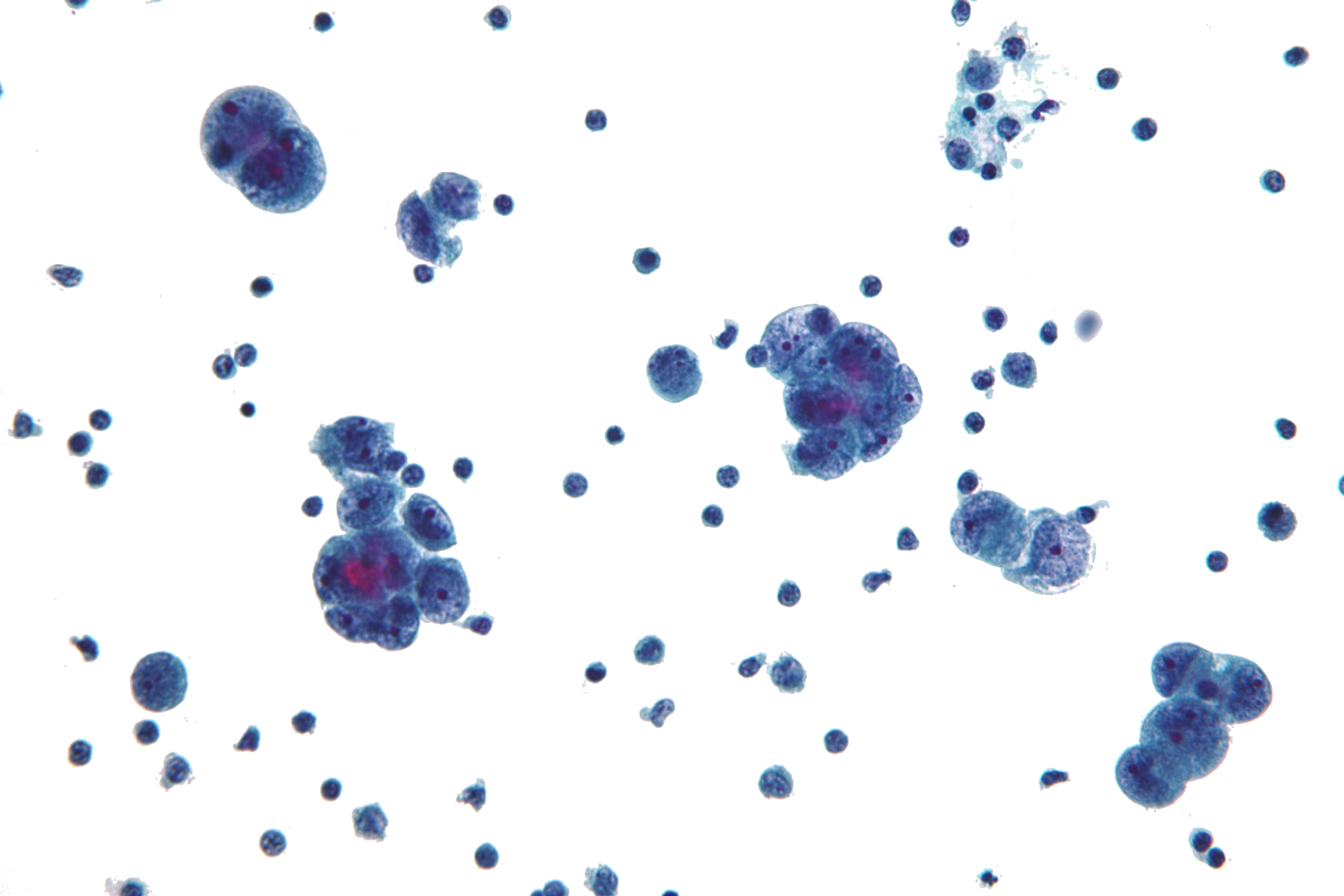
- Micrograph of a serous carcinoma, which may arise from the peritoneal lining
- Specialty: Oncology

Primary peritoneal cancer or carcinoma is also known as serous surface papillary carcinoma, primary peritoneal carcinoma, extra-ovarian serous carcinoma, primary serous papillary carcinoma, and psammomacarcinoma. It was historically classified under "carcinoma of unknown primary" (CUP). Primary peritoneal cancer (PPC, or PPCa) is a cancer of the cells lining the peritoneum, or abdominal cavity. It usually affects women and is diagnosed after the age of 60; it very rarely affects men.

Histomorphological and molecular biological characteristics suggest that serous carcinomas, which include ovarian serous carcinoma, uterine serous carcinoma, fallopian tube serous carcinoma, cervical serous carcinoma, and primary peritoneal serous carcinoma really represent one entity.

== Genetic causes ==
Although the precise causes are not known, a link with certain variants of BRCA1/2 has been described. Furthermore, women with BRCA1/2 mutation have a 5% risk of developing primary peritoneal cancer even after prophylactic oophorectomy.

Primary peritoneal carcinoma shows similar rates of tumor suppressor gene dysfunction (p53, BRCA, WT1) as ovarian cancer and can also show an increased expression of HER-2/neu.

An association with vascular endothelial growth factor has been observed.

== Prognosis ==
Prognosis and treatment is the same as for the most common type of ovarian cancer, which is epithelial ovarian cancer.

The median survival of primary peritoneal carcinomas is usually shorter by 2–6 months time when compared with serous ovarian cancer. Studies show median survival varies between 11.3 and 17.8 months. One study reported 19–40 month median survival (95% CI) with a five-year survival of 26.5%.

Elevated albumin levels have been associated with a more favorable prognosis.
