= Deruxtecan =

Names
- IUPAC name 6-(2,5-dioxopyrrol-1-yl)-N-[2-[[2-[[(2S)-1-[[2-[[2-[[(10S,23S)-10-ethyl-18-fluoro-10-hydroxy-19-methyl-5,9-dioxo-8-oxa-4,15-diazahexacyclo[14.7.1.0^{2,14}.0^{4,13}.0^{6,11}.0^{20,24}]tetracosa-1,6(11),12,14,16,18,20(24)-heptaen-23-yl]amino]-2-oxoethoxy]methylamino]-2-oxoethyl]amino]-1-oxo-3-phenylpropan-2-yl]amino]-2-oxoethyl]amino]-2-oxoethyl]hexanamide

Identifiers
CAS Number	1599440-13-7
3D model (JSmol)	Interactive image
ChemSpider	71045553
PubChem CID	118305111
UNII	5SEB972CO4
- InChI: InChI=1S/C52H56FN9O13/c1-3-52(73)33-19-38-48-31(24-62(38)50(71)32(33)25-75-51(52)72)47-35(14-13-30-28(2)34(53)20-36(60-48)46(30)47)58-43(67)26-74-27-57-41(65)22-56-49(70)37(18-29-10-6-4-7-11-29)59-42(66)23-55-40(64)21-54-39(63)12-8-5-9-17-61-44(68)15-16-45(61)69/h4,6-7,10-11,15-16,19-20,35,37,73H,3,5,8-9,12-14,17-18,21-27H2,1-2H3,(H,54,63)(H,55,64)(H,56,70)(H,57,65)(H,58,67)(H,59,66)/t35-,37-,52-/m0/s1 Key: WXNSCLIZKHLNSG-MCZRLCSDSA-N
- SMILES: CC[C@@]1(C2=C(COC1=O)C(=O)N3CC4=C5[C@H](CCC6=C5C(=CC(=C6C)F)N=C4C3=C2)NC(=O)COCNC(=O)CNC(=O)[C@H](CC7=CC=CC=C7)NC(=O)CNC(=O)CNC(=O)CCCCCN8C(=O)C=CC8=O)O

Properties
Chemical formula	C_{52}H_{56}FN_{9}O_{13}
Molar mass	1034.068 g·mol^{−1}
- Except where otherwise noted, data are given for materials in their standard state (at 25 °C [77 °F], 100 kPa). Infobox references

Deruxtecan is a chemical compound and a derivative of exatecan that acts as topoisomerase I inhibitor.

It is available linked to specific monoclonal antibody (antibody–drug conjugate), such as:

- Trastuzumab deruxtecan. It is licensed for the treatment of breast cancer or gastric or gastroesophageal adenocarcinoma.
- Patritumab deruxtecan, an experimental antibody–drug conjugate to treat non-small-cell lung cancer.
- Ifinatamab deruxtecan, an experimental anti-cancer treatment.
- Datopotamab deruxtecan (Datroway), used for the treatment of breast cancer
