= Raludotatug deruxtecan =

Experimental anti-cancer treatment

Identifiers
- CAS Number: 2610074-57-0
- DrugBank: DB19447
- UNII: BPQ010OFD7
- ChEMBL: ChEMBL5095329

Raludotatug deruxtecan (DS-6000) is an experimental anti-cancer treatment developed by Daiichi Sankyo and Merck. It is an antibody–drug conjugate that consists of a humanized IgG1 monoclonal antibody against the tumor-associated antigen cadherin-6 (CDH6), conjugated to deruxtecan (DXd), a cytotoxic DNA topoisomerase I inhibitor.

In September, 2025, it received breakthrough therapy designation from the FDA for adult patients with platinum-resistant ovarian, primary peritoneal or fallopian tube cancers that express CDH6 and were previously treated with bevacizumab.
