= Ambit Biosciences =

Ambit was an American pharmaceutical company focused on development of kinase inhibitor therapeutics to treat a variety of human diseases. (Note: The SEC 10K submission for 2013 indicates that the company is a "biopharmaceutical" company, which implies that they are primarily developing biopharmaceuticals; however, their lead product is a small molecule therapeutic, calling into question the term used in the SEC submission.) As of March 2014, the company was based in San Diego, California, and consisted of a single facility. Ambit made an initial public offering in May 2013, and was listed on the NASDAQ exchange under the symbol "AMBI". Ambit was acquired by Daiichi Sankyo in 2014 and is no longer traded on the NASDAQ exchange.

== Products ==
As of March 2014, three products were under development, of which quizartinib was their lead drug candidate.

== Business model ==
In June 2010, Ambit completed a Series D-2 round of equity financing, raising $30 million in new capital. The investor syndicate was led by Apposite Capital LLP and included existing investors such as Perseus-Soros Biopharmaceutical Fund, OrbiMed Advisors, Forward Ventures, Roche Venture Fund, MedImmune Ventures, GIMV, GrowthWorks, Genechem, Radius Ventures, NovaQuest and Horizon Technology Finance.

As of March 2014, Ambit sought to develop new therapeutics through internal, proprietary research, which is evidenced by their pipeline of three products consisting entirely of internally developed therapeutics. Further, Ambit aimed to be a full life cycle pharmaceutical company by conducting discovery, development and further commercialization of therapeutics.

Among the firms who invested heavily in Ambit prior to its initial public offering was Foresite Capital in January 2013.

In November 2014, Ambit was acquired by Daiichi Sankyo. The prime asset that drove this deal was Ambit's quizartinib (AC220).
