= PureTech Health =

American company

- Type: Public
- Traded as: LSE: PRTC
- Industry: Healthcare
- Founded: 2005; 21 years ago
- Headquarters: Boston, United States
- Key people: Christopher Viehbacher (Chairman); Daphne Zohar (CEO)
- Products: Medicines
- Revenue: ▼$4.7 million (2025)
- Operating income: ▲$(98.5) million (2025)
- Net income: ▼$(110.1) million (2025)
- Website: puretechhealth.com

PureTech Health is an American biotechnology company which develops medicines to combat serious diseases. It is listed on the London Stock Exchange.

== History ==
The company was founded by Daphne Zohar, an American entrepreneur, in 2005. It was the subject of an initial public offering on the London Stock Exchange in June 2015.

== Operations ==
Previous logo

Companies which PureTech Health founded include Karuna Pharmaceuticals, Gelesis, which has received FDA approval as a treatment for weight management, Akili Interactive Labs, which is developing a digital therapeutic platform for cognitive disorders, Vedanta Biosciences, which is developing drugs to treat autoimmune and inflammatory diseases, and Follica which is developing new treatments for androgentic alopecia among others. PureTech also has a pipeline of its own immunology, lymphatic and oncology based therapeutics.
