= SN-38 =

Names
- Preferred IUPAC name (4S)-4,11-Diethyl-4,9-dihydroxy-1,4-dihydro-3H,14H-pyrano[3′,4′:6,7]indolizino[1,2-b]quinoline-3,14-dione
- Other names 7-Ethyl-10-hydroxycamptothecin

Identifiers
CAS Number	86639-52-3
3D model (JSmol)	Interactive image
ChEBI	CHEBI:8988
ChEMBL	ChEMBL837
ChemSpider	94634
ECHA InfoCard	100.171.154
IUPHAR/BPS	6925
PubChem CID	104842
UNII	0H43101T0J
CompTox Dashboard (EPA)	DTXSID4040399
- InChI: InChI=1S/C22H20N2O5/c1-3-12-13-7-11(25)5-6-17(13)23-19-14(12)9-24-18(19)8-16-15(20(24)26)10-29-21(27)22(16,28)4-2/h5-8,25,28H,3-4,9-10H2,1-2H3/t22-/m0/s1 Key: FJHBVJOVLFPMQE-QFIPXVFZSA-N
- SMILES: O=C\1N4\C(=C/C2=C/1COC(=O)[C@]2(O)CC)c3nc5c(c(c3C4)CC)cc(O)cc5

Properties
Chemical formula	C_{22}H_{20}N_{2}O_{5}
Molar mass	392.411 g·mol^{−1}
- Except where otherwise noted, data are given for materials in their standard state (at 25 °C [77 °F], 100 kPa). verify (what is ?) Infobox references

SN-38 is an antineoplastic drug. It is the active metabolite of irinotecan (an analog of camptothecin - a topoisomerase I inhibitor) but has 1000 times more activity than irinotecan itself. In vitro cytotoxicity assays show that the potency of SN-38 relative to irinotecan varies from 2- to 2000-fold.

SN38 is formed via hydrolysis of irinotecan by carboxylesterases and metabolized via glucuronidation by UGT1A1.

The variant of UGT1A1 in ~10% of Caucasians which leads to poor metabolism of SN-38 predicts irinotecan toxicity, as it is then less easily excreted from the body in its SN-38 glucuronide form.

SN-38 and its glucuronide are lost into the bile and intestines. It can cause the symptoms of diarrhoea and myelosuppression experienced by ~25% of the patients administered irinotecan.

== Use in antibody-drug conjugates ==
SN-38 has been utilized as the cytotoxic payload in the antibody-drug conjugate (ADC) sacituzumab govitecan. Unlike ADCs that employ ultra-toxic payloads with picomolar IC50 values, SN-38 is considered a moderately toxic agent with IC50 in the nanomolar range, potentially allowing for a lower off-target toxicity profile.

In sacituzumab govitecan, SN-38 is conjugated to an anti-Trop2 antibody via a cleavable CL2A linker, achieving a high drug-to-antibody ratio (DAR) of approximately 7.6. This high DAR allows for efficient delivery of the chemotherapeutic agent to tumor cells. The cleavable linker also facilitates the release of SN-38 in both the extracellular space and the cytoplasm. Once released, SN-38's membrane permeability enables it to diffuse out of target cancer cells and exert cytotoxic effects on neighboring cells regardless of their Trop2 expression status, a phenomenon known as the "bystander killing effect".

== Interactive pathway map ==
Click on genes, proteins and metabolites below to link to respective articles. (Note: The interactive pathway map can be edited at WikiPathways: "IrinotecanPathway_WP229".)

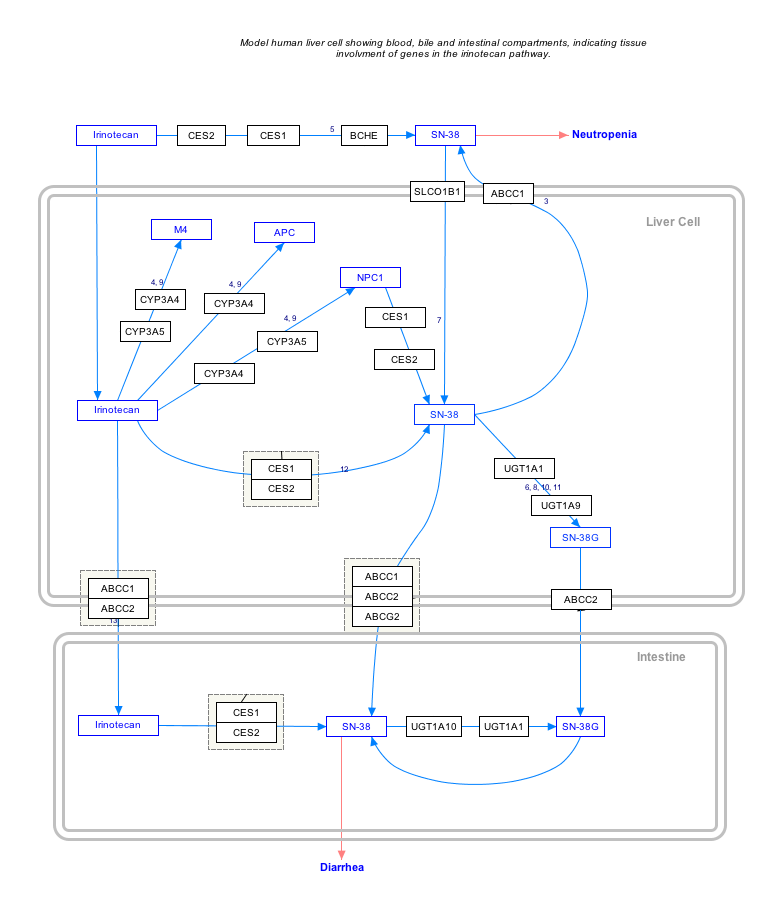

Irinotecan Pathway edit

== See also ==
- NK012, a nanodevice formulation of SN-38
- Sacituzumab govitecan, an antibody-drug conjugate that uses SN-38 as the cytotoxic drug.
