= Daiichi Sankyo =

Japanese pharmaceutical company

Daiichi Sankyo Company, Limited
- Native name: 第一三共株式会社
- Romanized name: Daiichi Sankyō kabushiki gaisha
- Type: Public
- Traded as: TYO: 4568; TOPIX Large 70 Component; TOPIX 100 Component; Nikkei 225 Component
- Industry: Pharmaceutical
- Predecessors: Daiichi Pharmaceutical Company; Sankyo Company; Zepharma; Ambit Biosciences
- Founded: 2005; 21 years ago, in Tokyo, Japan (by merger)
- Headquarters: Daiichi Sankyo Building A/B 3-5-1, Nihonbashi-honcho, Chūō-ku, Tokyo 103–8426, Japan
- Key people: Sunao Manabe (Representative Director and CEO); Hiroyuki Okuzawa (Representative Director, President and COO); Ken Keller (President and CEO, Daiichi Sankyo, Inc.)
- Products: Medical equipment; Pharmaceutical products; Veterinary medicines
- Revenue: ▲$ 9.44 billion USD (FY 2022) (¥ 1,278 billion JPY) (FY 2022)
- Net income: ▲$ 812 million USD (FY 2022) (¥ 109.2 billion JPY) (FY 2022)
- Number of employees: 17,435 (as of May 2023)
- Website: www.daiichisankyo.com

Daiichi Sankyo Company, Limited (Japanese: 第一三共株式会社, Hepburn: Daiichi Sankyō Kabushiki-gaisha) is a global pharmaceutical company and the second-largest pharmaceutical company in Japan. It achieved JPY 1,278 billion in revenue in 2022. The company owns the American pharmaceutical company American Regent.

Daiichi Sankyo, Inc. (DSI) began operating in the U.S. in 2006. It is the U.S. subsidiary of Daiichi Sankyo Company, Limited, and a member of the Daiichi Sankyo Group. The organization, which includes U.S. commercial operations and global clinical development (Daiichi Sankyo Pharma Development), is headquartered in Basking Ridge, New Jersey.

Daiichi Sankyo Europe, GmbH (DSE), the European subsidiary, is headquartered in Munich, Germany. The organization is responsible for development and manufacturing for 12 European countries.

Daiichi Sankyo Company, Limited is a full member of the European Federation of Pharmaceutical Industries and Associations (EFPIA) and of the International Federation of Pharmaceutical Manufacturers and Associations (IFPMA).

== History ==
Daiichi Sankyo was established in 2005 through the merger of Sankyo Company, Limited (三共株式会社, Sankyō Kabushiki Kaisha) and Daiichi Pharmaceutical Company, Limited (第一製薬株式会社, Daiichi Seiyaku Kabushiki Kaisha), which were century-old pharmaceutical companies based in Japan.

Sankyo Co., Ltd. was founded by Jokichi Takamine, who patented the isolation of adrenaline. Takamine was president of Sankyo Co., Ltd from March 1913 until July 1922.

In 1990, Sankyo acquired the German Luitpold-Werk Group, a pharmaceutical company based in Munich. In 2019, Luitpold renamed itself after its American Regent brand. American Regent, now based in the United States, is a subsidiary of Daiichi Sankyo.

=== Acquisitions ===
In 2006, Daiichi Sankyo acquired Zepharma, the OTC drugs unit of Astellas Pharma. On June 10, 2008, the company agreed to take a majority (64%) stake in Indian generic drug maker Ranbaxy, with a deal valued at about $4.6 billion.

It acquired U3 Pharma in June 2008, contributing a therapeutic anti-HER3 antibody to the company's anticancer portfolio. The company closed U3 Pharma in 2015.

The acquisition of Plexxikon, a Berkeley, California-based pharmaceutical start-up company, was completed on April 4, 2011, for $805 million and an additional $130 million in milestone payments, pending on the success of Vemurafenib (Plexxikon's lead program) an oral, novel drug that targets the oncogenic BRAF mutation present in about half of melanoma cancers and about eight percent of all solid tumors. Daiichi Sankyo is retaining US co-promotion right of the (Roche licensed) drug. The shutdown of Plexxikon was announced in 2022 as Daiichi Sankyo pivots to focus on more antibody-drug conjugate therapies.

On April 7, 2014, Daiichi Sankyo announced it had agreed to vote its shares in Ranbaxy in favor of Sun Pharma's acquisition of 100% of Ranbaxy through the merger process which entailed a share swap. On September 29, 2014, Daiichi Sankyo agreed to acquire Ambit Biosciences for approximately $410 million, the deal enabled Daiichi to gain the cancer compound quizartinib. On April 20, 2015, the company announced it had sold off the 8.9% stake in Sun Pharmaceutical Industries it acquired when acquiring Ranbaxy, raising $3.2 billion.

It transferred 41 of its products in Japan to Alfresa Holdings Corporation for JPY 4.2 billion in 2018 in order to focus on oncology. The company acquired ramosetron, nicardipine and barnidipine from Astellas Pharma in October 2019.

In January 2020, the company's market value rose above JPY 5 trillion after the U.S. Food and Drug Administration approval and release of Enhertu, an antibody-drug conjugate for cancer treatment. Daiichi Sankyo developed Enhertu in cooperation with AstraZeneca, which agreed in March 2019 to pay up to $6.9 billion to Daiichi Sankyo in exchange for a share of Enhertu's sales.

The following is an illustration of the company's major mergers and acquisitions and historical predecessors (this is not a comprehensive list):

- Daiichi Sankyo
  - - - - - Daiichi Sankyo
            - Sankyo Company, Limited
            - Daiichi Pharmaceutical Company, Limited
          - Zepharma
            (Acq 2006)
        - - Ranbaxy Laboratories
            (Acq 2008)
      - - U3 Pharma
          (Acq 2008)
    - - Plexxikon
        (Acq 2011)
  - - Ambit Biosciences
      (Acq 2014)

=== Kickbacks, 2015 ===
As of 2015, Daiichi Sankyo was being "closely monitored" after settling charges concerning payment of remuneration to physicians in the form of speaker fees as part of company's Physician Organization and Discussion program, in violation of the False Claims Act, an anti-kickback statute.

Daiichi Sankyo agreed to pay the United States and state Medicaid programs $39 million to settle allegations by the United States Department of Justice over kickbacks to doctors. As part of the company's Physician Organization and Discussion program which ran from 2005 through 2011, Daiichi Sankyo paid physicians improper kickbacks in the form of speaker fees to induce physicians to prescribe Daiichi Sankyo's drugs, including Azor, Benicar, Tribenzor and Welchol. Allegedly, payments were made to physicians even when physician participants in PODs took turns "speaking" on duplicative topics over Daiichi-paid dinners, the recipient spoke only to members of their own staff in their own office, or the associated dinner was so lavish that its cost exceeded Daiichi Sankyo's own internal cost limitation of $140 per person.

"Schemes such as this are particularly abhorrent," said Inspector General Daniel R. Levinson for the U.S. Department of Health and Human Services. "Manufacturers and physicians who engage in them are cheating Medicare and Medicaid out of millions of dollars and threatening programs upon which many elderly and disabled Americans rely. My office will take whatever steps necessary to guard against improper alliances between manufacturers of drugs and those who prescribe them. Through our corporate integrity agreement we will be closely monitoring Daiichi Sankyo."

== Products ==
This list is not comprehensive.

Oncology

- Enhertu (trastuzumab deruxtecan, fam-trastuzumab deruxtecan-nxki in the United States only)
- Ezharmia (valemetostat) (available only in Japan)
- Turalio (pexidartinib) (available only in the United States)
- Vanflyta (quizartinib)
- Zelboraf (vemurafenib)

Cardiovascular

- Effient (prasugrel) (co-marketed with Eli Lilly and Company; also sold as Efient)
- Lixiana/Savaysa (edoxaban)
- Minnebro (esaxerenone) (available only in Japan)
- Nilemdo (bempedoic acid, only sold in the EU)
- Nustendi (fixed dose combination of bempedoic acid and ezetimibe)

Other

- Canalia (teneligliptin, canagliflozin) (available only in Japan)
- Evoxac (cevimeline hydrochloride)
- Injectafer (ferric carboxymaltose injection)
- Memary (memantine hydrochloride) (available only in Japan)
- Nexium (esomeprazole) (only in Japan; marketed by AstraZeneca elsewhere)
- Pralia (denosumab) (only available in Japan; also sold there as Ranmark)
- Tarlige (mirogabalin) (only available in Japan)
- Tenelia (teneligliptin hydrobromide hydrate)
- Venofer (iron sucrose)
- Vimpat (lacosamide) (only available in Japan; co-marketed with UCB)
- Welchol (colesevelam HCl)

== Pipeline candidates ==
Select mid-stage and late-stage investigational candidates in Daiichi-Sankyo's pipeline include:

- Datopotamab deruxtecan (Dato-DXd)
- Patritumab deruxtecan (HER3-DXd)
- VN-0102
- Teserpaturev (DS-1647)
- Ifinatamab deruxtecan (I-DXd; DS-7300)
- Raludotatug deruxtecan (R-DXd; DS-6000)
