= Tumor-associated calcium signal transducer =

Tumor-associated calcium signal transducer (TACSTD) is the name of two human proteins and the genes that encode them:

- Tumor-associated calcium signal transducer 1 (Epithelial cell adhesion molecule, EpCAM)
- Tumor-associated calcium signal transducer 2
