= Perfect mirror =

Mirror that solely reflects light without absorption or transmission

In optics, a perfect mirror is a mirror that reflects light (and electromagnetic radiation in general) perfectly, and does not transmit or absorb it.

== General ==
Domestic mirrors are not perfect mirrors as they absorb a significant portion of the light which falls on them.

Dielectric mirrors are glass or other substrates on which one or more layers of dielectric material are deposited, to form an optical coating. A very complex dielectric mirror can reflect up to 99.999% of the light incident upon it, for a narrow range of wavelengths and angles. A simpler mirror may reflect 99.9% of the light, but may cover a broader range of wavelengths.

Almost any dielectric material can act as a perfect mirror through total internal reflection. This effect only occurs at shallow angles, however, and only for light inside the material. The effect happens when light goes from a medium with a higher index of refraction to one with a lower value (like air).

A new type of dielectric "perfect mirror" was developed in 1998 by researchers at MIT. These unusual mirrors are very efficient reflectors over a broad range of angles and wavelengths, and are insensitive to polarization. A version of the perfect mirror that was developed at MIT for military use is used by OmniGuide in laser surgery.

== See also ==
- Superlens
- Superprism
- Neutron supermirror
