= OrbiMed =

American investment firm

OrbiMed Advisors LLC
- Formerly: Mehta & Isaly
- Type: Private
- Industry: Investment management
- Founded: 1998; 28 years ago
- Founder: Samuel Isaly; Michael Sheffery; Arvind Desai
- Headquarters: Citigroup Center, New York City, New York, U.S.
- Products: Public equity Private equity Venture capital Private credit
- AUM: US$18 billion (March 2024)
- Number of employees: 112 (March 2024)
- Website: orbimed.com

OrbiMed (OrbiMed Advisors) is an American investment firm based in New York City, United States. It is focused on making public and private investments in the Healthcare and Biotechnology industries. OrbiMed is considered one of the world's largest dedicated healthcare investment firms.

== Background ==
In 1989, S.G Warburg pharmaceutical analysts Viren Mehta and Samuel Isaly founded Mehta & Isaly, a money-management and research firm. This was the predecessor firm to OrbiMed. The firm made its first venture capital investment in 1993.

In 1998, Mehta & Isaly split up into two entities, with Mehta forming Mehta Partners and Isaly forming OrbiMed Advisors.

In 2007, OrbiMed expanded into Asia, opening offices in Shanghai and Mumbai. In 2010, the firm expanded into the Middle East, opening an office in Herzliya, Israel.

In December 2017, Isaly stepped down from his role as managing partner of OrbiMed due to allegations of sexual harassment raised by former female employees.

In 2025, OrbiMed raised $1.86B in the company's largest royalty and credit fund to date.

== Notable investments ==
- AbCellera Biologics
- Acceleron Pharma
- Ambit Biosciences
- California Institute for Quantitative Biosciences
- Cynapsus Therapeutics
- DFINE, Inc.
- Gelesis
- Intercept Pharmaceuticals
- Natera
- OmniGuide
- TigerConnect
- Vanqua
