= BTBD1 =

Protein-coding gene in the species Homo sapiens

Identifiers
- Aliases: BTBD1, C15orf1, NS5ATP8, BTB domain containing 1
- External IDs: OMIM: 608530; MGI: 1933765; GeneCards: BTBD1

Gene location (Human)
Chr.	Chromosome 15 (human)
Band	15q25.2	Start	83,016,423 bp
Band	15q25.2	End	83,067,252 bp

Gene location (Mouse)
Chr.	Chromosome 7 (mouse)
Band	7|7 D3	Start	81,441,822 bp
Band	7|7 D3	End	81,479,179 bp
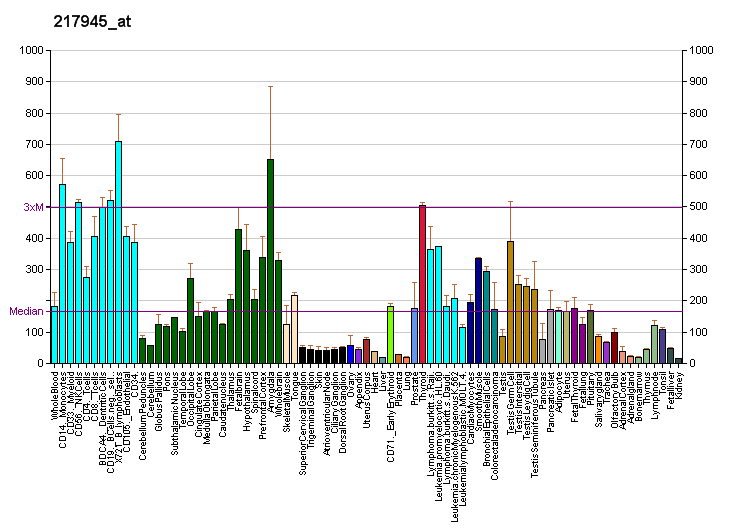
RNA expression pattern
Bgee	Human / Mouse (ortholog); Top expressed in: Skeletal muscle tissue of rectus abdominis; vastus lateralis muscle; biceps brachii; body of tongue; thoracic diaphragm; Skeletal muscle tissue of biceps brachii; deltoid muscle; glutes; tibialis anterior muscle; myocardium / Top expressed in: spermatid; spermatocyte; testicle; ovary; quadriceps femoris muscle; muscle of thigh; neural layer of retina; skeletal muscle tissue; olfactory bulb; dentate gyrus of hippocampal formation granule cell; More reference expression data
BioGPS	More reference expression data
Gene ontology
Molecular function	protein binding; ubiquitin protein ligase binding
Cellular component	cytoplasm; P-body; SCF ubiquitin ligase complex; cytosol; protein-containing complex
Biological process	regulation of protein binding; protein ubiquitination; regulation of proteolysis; proteasome-mediated ubiquitin-dependent protein catabolic process; neurogenesis; post-translational protein modification; muscle organ development; cell differentiation
Sources:Amigo / QuickGO
Orthologs
Databases	NCBI: entry; OMA: entry
Species	Human	Mouse
Entrez	53339	83962
Ensembl	ENSG00000064726	ENSMUSG00000025103
UniProt	Q9H0C5	P58544
RefSeq (mRNA)	NM_001011885; NM_025238	NM_146193
RefSeq (protein)	NP_001011885; NP_079514	NP_666305
Location (UCSC)	Chr 15: 83.02 – 83.07 Mb	Chr 7: 81.44 – 81.48 Mb
PubMed search
- Wikidata
View/Edit Human	View/Edit Mouse

BTB/POZ domain-containing protein 1 is a protein that in humans is encoded by the BTBD1 gene.

== Function ==
The C-terminus of the protein encoded by this gene binds topoisomerase I. The N-terminus contains a proline-rich region and a BTB/POZ domain (broad-complex, Tramtrack and bric a brac/Pox virus and Zinc finger), both of which are typically involved in protein-protein interactions. Subcellularly, the protein localizes to cytoplasmic bodies. Alternative splicing results in multiple transcript variants encoding different isoforms.

== Interactions ==
BTBD1 has been shown to interact with TOP1.
