= Gelesis =

American biotechnology company

- Type: Private
- Traded as: NYSE: GLS
- Industry: Healthcare, Biotechnology
- Founded: 2006
- Headquarters: Boston, Massachusetts, USA
- Key people: John LaMattina, PhD – Chairman, Yishai Zohar - CEO and Founder, David Pass, PharmD – Chief Operating Officer
- Website: www.gelesis.com

Gelesis is a biotechnology company located in Boston, Massachusetts that developed the weight loss device Gelesis100 (Plenity) for use in overweight and obesity. The company produces Gelesis100, which is a superabsorbent hydrogel capsule that expands in the stomach, creating a feeling of fullness, helping people reduce the amount of food they eat. The company was founded in 2006 to develop medical devices and treatments for obesity.

Gelesis Holdings, Inc. together with its two affiliates, filed for voluntary Chapter 7 liquidation in the United States Bankruptcy Court for the District of Delaware on October 30, 2023. The debtor listed its assets among the 50 and the $100 million and liabilities of $44.34 million. The Debtor is represented by Kenneth Listwak of Troutman Pepper Hamilton Sanders LLP as counsel.

== History ==
Gelesis was founded by PureTech Ventures, a life sciences venture firm based in Boston, and ExoTech Bio, an Israel-based research and development company. The company operates as an affiliate of PureTech Health. Former PureTech Ventures partner Yishai Zohar co-founded the company and served as CEO.

The company's technology was co-invented by Alessandro Sannino, a professor of engineering at the University of Salento, who began researching the idea prior to the launch of Gelesis.

In 2010, the company passed the first human trials of its treatment. The company's product was originally called Attiva, but was later renamed Gelesis100.

In January 2022, the company completed a business combination with Capstar Special Purpose Acquisition Corp. and commenced trading on the New York Stock Exchange under the ticker symbol “GLS."

== Funding ==
In January 2008, the company raised $16 million in its first financing round, led by OrbiMed Advisors and Queensland BioCapital Funds.

In 2014, Gelesis raised $12 million in its fifth funding round, bringing its total funding to $42 million.

In March 2015, the company closed a $22 million funding round. In April 2015, the company announced an initial public offering (IPO) for $60 million, but pulled out later that year. In December 2015, Gelesis raised $31.5 million shortly after cancelling its IPO.

In 2018, Gelesis raised $30 million in preparation for regulatory submissions in the U.S. and Europe and initial marketing of Gelesis100.
