= DFINE, Inc. =

- Founded: 2004
- Headquarters: San Jose, California, United States
- Number of locations: 11 countries (direct in the U.S. and Germany)
- Key people: Greg Barrett, CEO; Dan Balbierz - Chief Development Officer
- Products: StabiliT Vertebral Augmentation System; STAR Tumor Ablation System
- Number of employees: 150
- Website: www.dfineinc.com

DFINE, Inc. was an American medical device company with headquarters in San Jose, California. It was known for its development of minimally invasive therapeutic devices built upon a radiofrequency platform for the treatment of spinal diseases. The platform included two applications, the StabiliT Vertebral Augmentation System for the treatment of vertebral compression fractures and the STAR Tumor Ablation System for pain relief treatment of metastatic spinal tumors.

== History ==
DFINE was founded in 2004 in San Jose, California. It has had five rounds of funding since inception. The first being $35 million in 2009 led by Prospect Venture Partners. In January 2010 it received an additional $2.8 million. It received $36.2 million in equity finance in July 2010, led by Split Rock Partners with participation from OrbiMed, Prospect Venture Partners, and Vanguard Ventures. Its fourth round was $25 million with an additional $1.8 million coming in April 2012.

In 2011, DFINE was awarded a five-year Federal Supply Schedule from the United States Department of Veterans Affairs. The contract included DFINE supplying its StabiliT System and related products to the Veterans Health Administration.

Merit Medical Systems, Inc. (NASDAQ:MMSI), a leading manufacturer and marketer of proprietary disposable devices used primarily in cardiology, radiology and endoscopy, announced on June 06, 2016 that it has acquired DFINE, Inc. in a merger transaction through which DFINE became a wholly owned subsidiary of Merit. The purchase consideration was approximately $97.5 million in cash and was financed by a group of banks led by Wells Fargo and included Bank of America, HSBC and U.S. Bank.

== Products ==
DFINE developed products for the treatment of spinal diseases using a radiofrequency platform. The platform covers two procedures, one for the treatment of vertebral compression fractures and one for palliative treatment of metastatic spinal tumors. Both have received clearance from the United States Food and Drug Administration and CE Mark approval for use within the European Economic Area.

=== StabiliT Vertebral Augmentation System ===
The StabiliT System is an FDA cleared device that uses radiofrequency targeted vertebral augmentation (also written RF-TVA) to repair compression fractures in the vertebrae. it is a minimally invasive procedure designed to preserve good bone while performing kyphoplasty. In contrast with balloon kyphoplasty, RF-TVA is performed by a physician navigating within the vertebral body by placing a working canula into the vertebra and creating a cavity using a small chisel-like instrument. The cavity is then filled with ultra-high viscosity bone cement which then permeates into the surrounding bone, stabilizing the fracture and restoring vertebral height. As of 2014, the system has been used to treat more than 15,000 spinal fractures worldwide.

=== STAR Tumor Ablation System ===
The STAR Tumor Ablation System is an FDA-cleared medical device that uses targeted radiofrequency ablation (also written t-RFA) to heat and destroy cancerous tumors caused by metastatic disease that has spread to the spine, causing severe pain and discomfort. STAR is not used as a treatment for cancer, but for pain relief. It is typically an outpatient procedure and can be performed using local anesthesia through a small incision. It works by placing a small steerable device into the vertebra which is guided by the physician to precisely target the tumor. The system then ablates the tumor, destroying the tumor cells while minimizing damage to surrounding tissues. In some cases it has been shown to alleviate pain with one treatment.

== See also ==
- Interventional radiology
- Neoplasm
- Cancer pain
