= CD135 =

Protein found in humans

FLT3

Identifiers
- Aliases: FLT3, CD135, FLK-2, FLK2, STK1, fms related tyrosine kinase 3, fms related receptor tyrosine kinase 3
- External IDs: OMIM: 136351; MGI: 95559; GeneCards: FLT3
Available structures
PDB	Ortholog search: PDBe RCSB
PDB	List of PDB id codes 1RJB, 3QS7, 3QS9, 4RT7, 4XUF
Enzyme activity
EC #	BRENDA	ExPASy	KEGG	MetaCyc
2.7.10.1	↗	↗	↗	↗

Gene location (Human)
Chr.	Chromosome 13 (human)
Band	13q12.2	Start	28,003,274 bp
Band	13q12.2	End	28,100,592 bp

Gene location (Mouse)
Chr.	Chromosome 5 (mouse)
Band	5 86.88 cM|5 G3	Start	147,267,551 bp
Band	5 86.88 cM|5 G3	End	147,337,299 bp
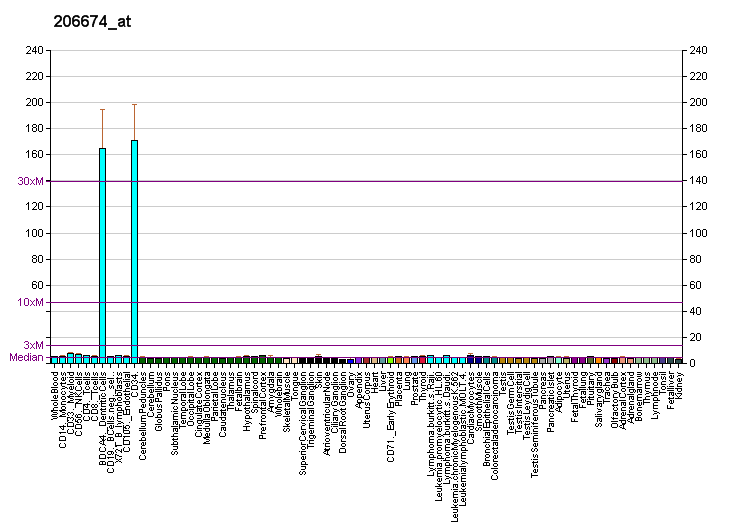
RNA expression pattern
Bgee	Human / Mouse (ortholog); Top expressed in: testicle; cerebellar hemisphere; monocyte; right hemisphere of cerebellum; bone marrow cell; lymph node; granulocyte; body of pancreas; spleen; appendix / Top expressed in: superior olivary complex; facial motor nucleus; red nucleus; mesenteric lymph nodes; set of nuclei of trapezoid body; cochlear nuclei; motor neuron; medial preoptic nucleus; Region IV of hippocampus proper; Region II of hippocampus proper; More reference expression data
BioGPS	More reference expression data
Gene ontology
Molecular function	vascular endothelial growth factor-activated receptor activity; nucleotide binding; protein kinase activity; transferase activity; protein homodimerization activity; kinase activity; protein binding; cytokine receptor activity; transmembrane receptor protein tyrosine kinase activity; protein tyrosine kinase activity; ATP binding; protein self-association; protein-containing complex binding; glucocorticoid receptor binding; 1-phosphatidylinositol-3-kinase activity; receptor tyrosine kinase; transmembrane signaling receptor activity
Cellular component	cytoplasm; integral component of membrane; cytosol; endoplasmic reticulum lumen; membrane; integral component of plasma membrane; nucleus; plasma membrane; endoplasmic reticulum; protein-containing complex; receptor complex
Biological process	leukocyte homeostasis; regulation of apoptotic process; dendritic cell differentiation; cell differentiation; myeloid progenitor cell differentiation; positive regulation of MAP kinase activity; phosphorylation; transmembrane receptor protein tyrosine kinase signaling pathway; common myeloid progenitor cell proliferation; positive regulation of tyrosine phosphorylation of STAT protein; cellular response to cytokine stimulus; positive regulation of phosphatidylinositol 3-kinase activity; protein phosphorylation; pro-B cell differentiation; cellular response to glucocorticoid stimulus; animal organ regeneration; response to organonitrogen compound; positive regulation of cell population proliferation; lymphocyte proliferation; protein autophosphorylation; positive regulation of phosphatidylinositol 3-kinase signaling; peptidyl-tyrosine phosphorylation; B cell differentiation; positive regulation of MAPK cascade; vascular endothelial growth factor signaling pathway; cytokine-mediated signaling pathway; hemopoiesis; MAPK cascade; phosphatidylinositol-3-phosphate biosynthetic process; negative regulation of signal transduction; viral process; negative regulation of apoptotic process; positive regulation of ERK1 and ERK2 cascade; hematopoietic progenitor cell differentiation; leukocyte differentiation; lymphocyte differentiation
Sources:Amigo / QuickGO
Orthologs
Databases	NCBI: entry; OMA: entry
Species	Human	Mouse
Entrez	2322	14255
Ensembl	ENSG00000122025	ENSMUSG00000042817
UniProt	P36888	Q00342
RefSeq (mRNA)	NM_004119	NM_010229
RefSeq (protein)	NP_004110	NP_034359
Location (UCSC)	Chr 13: 28 – 28.1 Mb	Chr 5: 147.27 – 147.34 Mb
PubMed search
- Wikidata
View/Edit Human	View/Edit Mouse

Cluster of differentiation antigen 135 (CD135) also known as fms like tyrosine kinase 3 (FLT-3 with fms standing for "feline McDonough sarcoma"), receptor-type tyrosine-protein kinase FLT3, or fetal liver kinase-2 (Flk2) is a protein that in humans is encoded by the FLT3 gene. FLT3 is a cytokine receptor which belongs to the receptor tyrosine kinase class III. CD135 is the receptor for the cytokine Flt3 ligand (FLT3L).

It is expressed on the surface of many hematopoietic progenitor cells. Signalling of FLT3 is important for the normal development of haematopoietic stem cells and progenitor cells.

The FLT3 gene is one of the most frequently mutated genes in acute myeloid leukemia (AML). High levels of wild-type FLT3 have been reported for blast cells of some AML patients without FLT3 mutations. These high levels may be associated with worse prognosis.

== Structure ==
FLT3 is composed of five extracellular immunoglobulin-like domains, an extracellular domain, a transmembrane domain, a juxtamembrane domain and a tyrosine-kinase domain consisting of 2 lobes that are connected by a tyrosine-kinase insert. Cytoplasmic FLT3 undergoes glycosylation, which promotes localization of the receptor to the membrane.

== Function ==
CD135 is a class III receptor tyrosine kinase. When this receptor binds to FLT3L a ternary complex is formed in which two FLT3 molecules are bridged by one (homodimeric) FLT3L. The formation of such complex brings the two intracellular domains in close proximity to each other, eliciting initial trans-phosphorylation of each kinase domain. This initial phosphorylation event further activates the intrinsic tyrosine kinase activity, which in turn phosphorylates and activates signal transduction molecules that propagate the signal in the cell. Signaling through CD135 plays a role in cell survival, proliferation, and differentiation. CD135 is important for lymphocyte (B cell and T cell) development.

Two cytokines that down modulate FLT3 activity (& block FLT3-induced hematopoietic activity) are:

- TNF-alpha (Tumor necrosis factor-alpha)
- TGF-beta (Transforming growth factor-beta)

TGF-beta especially, decreases FLT3 protein levels and reverses the FLT3L-induced decrease in the time that hematopoietic progenitors spend in the G1-phase of the cell cycle.

== Clinical significance ==
=== Cell surface marker ===
Cluster of differentiation (CD) molecules are markers on the cell surface, as recognized by specific sets of antibodies, used to identify the cell type, stage of differentiation and activity of a cell. In mice, CD135 is expressed on several hematopoietic (blood) cells, including long- and short-term reconstituting hematopoietic stem cells (HSC) and other progenitors like multipotent progenitors (MPPs) and common lymphoid progenitors (CLP).

=== Role in cancer ===
CD135 is a proto-oncogene, meaning that mutations of this protein can lead to cancer. Mutations of the FLT3 receptor can lead to the development of leukemia, a cancer of bone marrow hematopoietic progenitors. Internal tandem duplications of FLT3 (FLT3-ITD) are the most common mutations associated with acute myelogenous leukemia (AML) and are a prognostic indicator associated with adverse disease outcome.

=== FLT3 inhibitors ===
Gilteritinib, a dual FLT3-AXL tyrosine kinase inhibitor has completed a phase 3 trial of relapsed/refractory acute myeloid leukemia in patients with FLT3 ITD or TKD mutations. In 2017, gilteritinib gained FDA orphan drug status for AML. In November 2018, the FDA approved gilteritinib (Xospata) for treatment of adult patients with relapsed or refractory acute myeloid leukemia (AML) with a FLT3 mutation as detected by an FDA-approved test.

In July 2023, quizartinib (Vanflyta) was also approved for the treatment of newly diagnosed AML with FLT3 internal tandem duplication (ITD)-positive, as detected by an FDA-approved test. Precisely, it should be used with standard cytarabine and anthracycline induction and cytarabine consolidation, and as maintenance monotherapy following consolidation chemotherapy.

Midostaurin was approved by the FDA in April 2017 for the treatment of adult patients with newly diagnosed AML who are positive for oncogenic FLT3, in combination with chemotherapy. The drug is approved for use with a companion diagnostic, the LeukoStrat CDx FLT3 Mutation Assay, which is used to detect the FLT3 mutation in patients with AML.

Sorafenib has been reported to show significant activity against Flt3-ITD positive acute myelogenous leukemia.

Sunitinib also inhibits Flt3.

Clifutinib and lestaurtinib are in clinical trials.

A paper published in Nature in April 2012 studied patients who developed resistance to FLT3 inhibitors, finding specific DNA sites contributing to that resistance and highlighting opportunities for future development of inhibitors that could take into account the resistance-conferring mutations for a more potent treatment.

== See also ==
- Cluster of differentiation
- cytokine receptor
- receptor tyrosine kinase
- tyrosine kinase
- oncogene
- hematopoiesis
- Lymphopoiesis#Labeling lymphopoiesis
