= BTBD2 =

Protein-coding gene in the species Homo sapiens

Identifiers
- Aliases: BTBD2, BTB domain containing 2
- External IDs: OMIM: 608531; MGI: 1933831; GeneCards: BTBD2
Available structures
PDB	Human UniProt search: PDBe RCSB
PDB	List of PDB id codes 3NO8

Gene location (Human)
Chr.	Chromosome 19 (human)
Band	19p13.3	Start	1,985,438 bp
Band	19p13.3	End	2,034,881 bp

Gene location (Mouse)
Chr.	Chromosome 10 (mouse)
Band	10|10 C1	Start	80,478,451 bp
Band	10|10 C1	End	80,492,905 bp
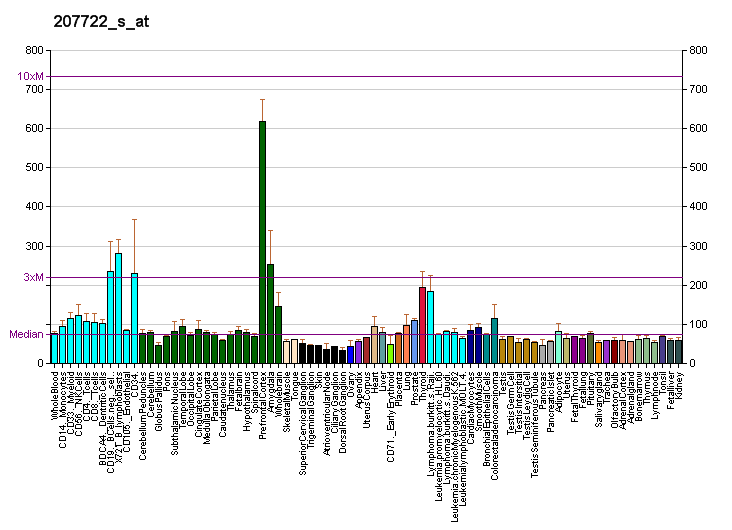

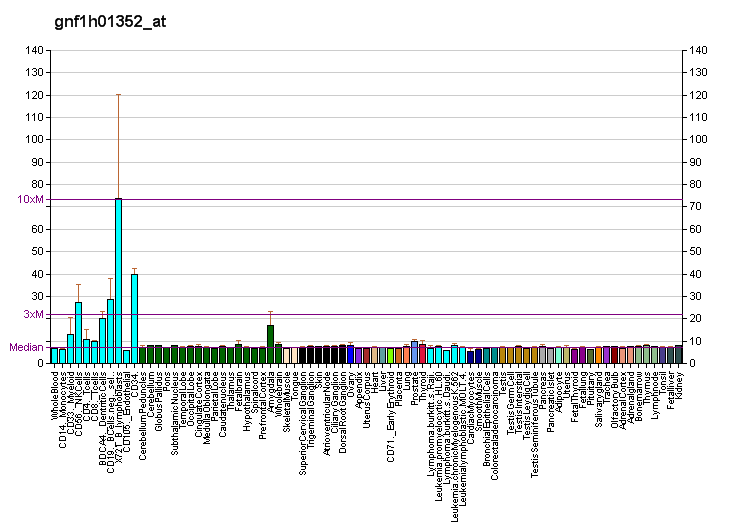
RNA expression pattern
Bgee	Human / Mouse (ortholog); Top expressed in: right frontal lobe; right hemisphere of cerebellum; anterior cingulate cortex; stromal cell of endometrium; right uterine tube; amygdala; right ovary; ventricular zone; apex of heart; left ovary / Top expressed in: interventricular septum; dentate gyrus of hippocampal formation granule cell; superior frontal gyrus; primary visual cortex; internal carotid artery; external carotid artery; muscle of thigh; neural layer of retina; zygote; otic vesicle; More reference expression data
BioGPS	More reference expression data
Gene ontology
Molecular function	protein binding; ubiquitin protein ligase binding
Cellular component	cytoplasm; SCF ubiquitin ligase complex; cytosol; P-body
Biological process	proteasome-mediated ubiquitin-dependent protein catabolic process; regulation of proteolysis; neurogenesis
Sources:Amigo / QuickGO
Orthologs
Databases	NCBI: entry; OMA: entry
Species	Human	Mouse
Entrez	55643	208198
Ensembl	ENSG00000133243	ENSMUSG00000003344
UniProt	Q9BX70	n/a
RefSeq (mRNA)	NM_017797	NM_145361; NM_001379084
RefSeq (protein)	NP_060267	n/a
Location (UCSC)	Chr 19: 1.99 – 2.03 Mb	Chr 10: 80.48 – 80.49 Mb
PubMed search
- Wikidata
View/Edit Human	View/Edit Mouse

BTB/POZ domain-containing protein 2 is a protein that in humans is encoded by the BTBD2 gene.

== Function ==
The C-terminus of the protein encoded by this gene binds topoisomerase I. The N-terminus contains a proline-rich region and a BTB/POZ domain (broad-complex, Tramtrack and bric a brac/Pox virus and Zinc finger), both of which are typically involved in protein-protein interactions. Subcellularly, the protein localizes to cytoplasmic bodies.

== Interactions ==
BTBD2 has been shown to interact with TOP1.
