= Clifutinib =

Investigational drug

Clinical data
- Other names: HEC-73543

Identifiers
- IUPAC name: 1-(5-tert-butyl-1,2-oxazol-3-yl)-3-[4-[2-[4-(3-morpholin-4-ylpropoxy)phenyl]ethynyl]phenyl]urea
- CAS Number: 1862226-99-0
- PubChem CID: 118665873
- IUPHAR/BPS: 13919
- UNII: 3BHA83P7NZ
- ChEMBL: ChEMBL6159776

Chemical and physical data
- Formula: C_{29}H_{34}N_{4}O_{4}
- Molar mass: 502.615 g·mol^{−1}
- 3D model (JSmol): Interactive image
- SMILES: CC(C)(C)C1=CC(=NO1)NC(=O)NC2=CC=C(C=C2)C#CC3=CC=C(C=C3)OCCCN4CCOCC4
- InChI: InChI=InChI=1S/C29H34N4O4/c1-29(2,3)26-21-27(32-37-26)31-28(34)30-24-11-7-22(8-12-24)5-6-23-9-13-25(14-10-23)36-18-4-15-33-16-19-35-20-17-33/h7-14,21H,4,15-20H2,1-3H3,(H2,30,31,32,34); Key:DWZXYPARIPYQKS-UHFFFAOYSA-N

Clifutinib is an investigational new drug that is being developed by Sunshine Lake Pharma Co., Ltd. for the treatment of acute myeloid leukaemia (AML). It is a fms related receptor tyrosine kinase 3 (FLT3) inhibitor.
