= Datopotamab deruxtecan =

Medication

Monoclonal antibody
- Type: Whole antibody
- Source: Humanized
- Target: Trop-2

Clinical data
- Pronunciation: da" toe poe' tah mab der" ux tee' kan
- Trade names: Datroway
- Other names: DS-1062a, Dato-DXd, datopotamab deruxtecan-dlnk
- AHFS/Drugs.com: Monograph
- MedlinePlus: a625030
- License data: US DailyMed: can deruxtecan
- Routes of administration: Intravenous
- Drug class: Antibody-drug conjugate
- ATC code: L01FX35 (WHO)

Legal status
- Legal status: US: ℞-only; EU: Rx-only

Identifiers
- CAS Number: 2238831-60-0
- DrugBank: DB16410
- UNII: GD2OWY1DTK
- KEGG: D12359

Chemical and physical data
- Formula: C_{6464}H_{10008}N_{1708}O_{2012}S_{44}
- Molar mass: 145251.75 g·mol^{−1}

Datopotamab deruxtecan, sold under the brand name Datroway, is an anti-cancer medication used for the treatment of breast cancer. It is a Trop-2-directed antibody and topoisomerase inhibitor antibody-drug conjugate.

The most common adverse reactions, including laboratory abnormalities, include stomatitis, nausea, fatigue, decreased leukocytes, decreased calcium, alopecia, decreased lymphocytes, decreased hemoglobin, constipation, decreased neutrophils, dry eye, vomiting, increased ALT, keratitis, increased AST, and increased alkaline phosphatase.

Datopotamab deruxtecan was approved for medical use in the United States in January 2025, and in the European Union in April 2025.

== Medical uses ==
Datopotamab deruxtecan is indicated for the treatment of adults with unresectable or metastatic, hormone receptor positive, human epidermal growth factor receptor 2-negative (IHC 0, IHC1+ or IHC2+/ISH-) breast cancer who have received prior endocrine-based therapy and chemotherapy for unresectable or metastatic disease.

In June 2025, the US Food and Drug Administration (FDA) expanded the indication to include the treatment of adults with locally advanced or metastatic epidermal growth factor receptor-mutated non-small cell lung cancer who have received prior epidermal growth factor receptor-directed therapy and platinum-based chemotherapy.

In May 2026, the FDA expanded the indication to include the treatment of adults with unresectable or metastatic triple-negative breast cancer who are not candidates for PD-1/PD-L1 inhibitor therapy.

== Side effects ==
The US prescribing information for datopotamab deruxtecan includes warnings and precautions for interstitial lung disease/pneumonitis, ocular adverse reactions, stomatitis/oral mucositis, and embryo-fetal toxicity.

Datopotamab deruxtecan is associated with a range of adverse events. The most common side effects are stomatitis, nausea, fatigue, alopecia (hair loss), constipation, vomiting, dry eye, keratitis, anemia, decreased appetite, increased aspartate transferase (AST), rash, diarrhea, neutropenia, and increased alanine aminotransferase (ALT).

== Pharmacology ==
=== Mechanism of action ===
As a antibody-drug conjugate (ADC), datopatomab deruxtecan binds to the carcinoma-associated antigen Trop-2, which is aberrantly expressed in some breast, colorectal, renal, and lung cancers. The drug-bound Trop2 protein undergoes receptor internalization, allowing the payload (i.e., the active anti-cancer drug) to be transported into the cell. It is transported into lysosomes. Inside the cell, it is split by selective cleaving of the tetrapeptide linker (Gly-Gly-Phe-Gly) by enzymes specific to tumor cells, such as cathepsins. It results in the release of exatecan, which acts on topoisomerase, an enzyme essential to DNA replication that controls coiling of the DNA helix, leading to DNA damage, cell replication arrest and, consequently, apoptosis. Then, exatecan is able to penetrate into neighboring cells, thereby causing a cascade of cell death. The minimum ihibitory concentration (MIC) of exatecan in vitro was shown to be equal to 0.31 μM. Exatecan is a derivative of camptothecin, a substance found in Camptotheca acuminata.

=== Pharmacokinetics ===
Datopatamab deruxtecan pharmacokinetic parameters after the first dose of 6 mg/kg
Parameter	Datopatamab deruxtecan	Deruxtecan
C_{max}	154 μg/mL	2.8 ng/mL
AUC	671 μg*day/mL	18 ng*day/mL
mean steady state volume	3.5	n/d
plasma protein binding	n/a	98%
blood-to-plasma concentration ratio	n/d	0.6 (in vitro)
half life (t_{1/2})	4.8 days	5.5 days
clearance	0.6 L/day	n/d

==== Metabolism and interactions ====
Deruxtecan is metabolised by CYP3A4, without notable glucuronidation. Moreover, it is a substrate of several transporter systems, i.e. OATP1B1, OATP1B3, MATE2-K, P-gp, MRP1 and BCRP. Therefore, use with itraconazole (CYP3A inhibitor) and ritonavir (OATP1B/CYP3A inhibitor) is contraindicated.

== History ==
Efficacy was evaluated in TROPION-Breast01 (NCT05104866), a multicenter, open-label, randomized trial. Participants must have experienced disease progression, been deemed unsuitable for further endocrine therapy, and have received one or two lines of prior chemotherapy for unresectable or metastatic disease. Participants were excluded for a history of ILD/pneumonitis requiring steroids, ongoing ILD/pneumonitis, clinically active brain metastases, or clinically significant corneal disease. Participants also were excluded for ECOG performance status >1. Randomization was stratified by previous lines of chemotherapy, prior CDK4/6 inhibitor treatment, and geographical region. A total of 732 participants were randomized (1:1) to datopotamab deruxtecan (n=365) or investigator's choice of chemotherapy (n=367); eribulin (60%), capecitabine (21%), vinorelbine (10%), or gemcitabine (9%).

Efficacy was evaluated in a pooled subgroup of 114 participants with locally advanced or metastatic epidermal growth factor receptor-mutated non-small cell lung cancer who had received prior treatment with an epidermal growth factor receptor-directed therapy and platinum-based chemotherapy and received datopotamab deruxtecan at the recommended dose across two clinical trials: TROPION-Lung05 and TROPION-Lung01. TROPION-Lung05 (NCT04484142) was a multi-center, single-arm trial, while TROPION-Lung01 (NCT04656652) was a multi-center, open-label, randomized controlled trial.

The US Food and Drug Administration granted the application for datopotamab deruxtecan priority review and breakthrough therapy designations.

Efficacy was evaluated in TROPION-Breast02 (NCT05374512), a multicenter, open-label, randomized trial of 644 participants with unresectable or metastatic triple-negative breast cancer who had not received prior chemotherapy or other systemic anti-cancer therapy for unresectable or metastatic breast cancer and who were not candidates for PD-1/PD-L1 inhibitor therapy. Participants were excluded for a history of ILD/pneumonitis requiring treatment with steroids, ongoing ILD/pneumonitis, or clinically significant corneal disease at screening. Randomization was stratified by geographical region (United States, Canada and Europe, or rest of world), PD-L1 status (positive or negative) and disease-free interval history (de novo or ≤12 months or >12 months). Participants were randomized (1:1) to receive either datopotamab deruxtecan-dlnk (N=323) or investigator's choice of chemotherapy (N=321); paclitaxel (28%), nab-paclitaxel (54%), capecitabine (2.2%), eribulin (11%) or carboplatin (4.7%).

== Society and culture ==
=== Legal status ===
Datopotamab deruxtecan was approved for medical use in the United States in January 2025. In December 2024, the US Food and Drug Administration granted the application for datopotamab deruxtecan breakthrough therapy designation.

In January 2025, the Committee for Medicinal Products for Human Use of the European Medicines Agency adopted a positive opinion, recommending the granting of a marketing authorization for the medicinal product Datroway, intended for the treatment of breast cancer. The applicant for this medicinal product is Daiichi Sankyo Europe GmbH. Datopotamab deruxtecan was authorized for medical use in the European Union in April 2025.

=== Names ===
Datopotamab deruxtecan is the international nonproprietary name, and the United States Adopted Name.

Datopotamab deruxtecan is sold under the brand name Datroway.
