= Ifinatamab deruxtecan =

Antibody-drug conjugate

Clinical data
- Other names: DS-7300
- ATC code: L01FX38 (WHO)

Identifiers
- CAS Number: 2484870-92-8
- UNII: C6I0GC0GX5
- KEGG: D12753

Ifinatamab deruxtecan (DS-7300) is an experimental anti-cancer treatment developed by Daiichi Sankyo and Merck. It is an antibody–drug conjugate that "consists of an anti-B7-H3 antibody linked with a DNA topoisomerase I inhibiting anti-tumor agent".

Ifinatamab-DXd is in phase III clinical trials for extensive stage small cell lung carcinoma (EC-SCLC) from 2024 onward. I-DXd progressed directly from Phase I to Phase III, due to exceptional response rates (>65% ORR) in a difficult to treat cancer. I-DXd is also in Phase III trials for metastatic castration resistant prostate cancer from 2025
