= Trastuzumab deruxtecan =

Medication

Monoclonal antibody
- Type: Whole antibody
- Source: Humanized
- Target: HER2

Clinical data
- Trade names: Enhertu
- Other names: DS-8201a, fam-trastuzumab deruxtecan-nxki
- AHFS/Drugs.com: Monograph
- MedlinePlus: a620006
- License data: US DailyMed: Trastuzumab deruxtecan
- Pregnancy category: AU: D
- Routes of administration: Intravenous
- Drug class: Antineoplastic
- ATC code: L01FD04 (WHO)

Legal status
- Legal status: AU: S4 (Prescription only); CA: ℞-only / Schedule D; UK: POM (Prescription only); US: ℞-only; EU: Rx-only; Rx-only

Identifiers
- CAS Number: 1826843-81-5
- PubChem SID: 384585505
- DrugBank: DB14962
- UNII: 5384HK7574
- KEGG: D11529
- ChEMBL: ChEMBL4297844

Chemical and physical data
- Formula: C_{6460}H_{9972}N_{1724}O_{2014}S_{44}.(C_{52}H_{57}F_{1}N_{9}O_{13})_{8}

Trastuzumab deruxtecan, sold under the brand name Enhertu, is an antibody-drug conjugate consisting of the humanized monoclonal antibody trastuzumab (Herceptin) covalently linked to the topoisomerase I inhibitor deruxtecan (a derivative of exatecan). It is licensed for the treatment of breast cancer, non-small cell lung cancer (NSCLC), gastric or gastroesophageal adenocarcinoma. Trastuzumab binds to and blocks signaling through epidermal growth factor receptor 2 (HER2/neu) on cancers that rely on it for growth. Additionally, once bound to HER2 receptors, the antibody is internalized by the cell, carrying the bound deruxtecan along with it, where it interferes with the cell's ability to make DNA structural changes and replicate its DNA during cell division, leading to DNA damage when the cell attempts to replicate itself, destroying the cell.

Trastuzumab deruxtecan was approved for medical use in the United States in December 2019, in Japan in March 2020, in the European Union in January 2021, and in Australia in October 2021. It is the first approved therapy by the US Food and Drug Administration (FDA) targeted to people with the HER2-low breast cancer subtype subset of HER2-negative breast cancer.

== Medical uses ==
Trastuzumab deruxtecan is indicated for the treatment of adults with unresectable (unable to be removed with surgery) or metastatic (when cancer cells spread to other parts of the body) HER2-positive breast cancer who have received two or more prior anti-HER2-based regimens in the metastatic setting and for adults with locally advanced or metastatic HER2-positive gastric or gastroesophageal junction adenocarcinoma who have received a prior trastuzumab-based regimen.

In May 2022, the US Food and Drug Administration (FDA) expanded the indication to include the treatment of adults with unresectable or metastatic HER2-positive breast cancer who have received a prior anti-HER2-based regimen either in the metastatic setting, or in the neoadjuvant or adjuvant setting and have developed disease recurrence during or within six months of completing therapy.

In August 2022, the FDA expanded the indication to include the treatment of unresectable or metastatic HER2-low breast cancer.

In April 2024, the FDA expanded the indication to include the treatment of unresectable or metastatic HER2-positive (IHC3+) solid tumors for adults who have received prior systemic treatment and have no satisfactory alternative treatment options.

== Side effects and label warnings ==
The most common side effects are nausea, fatigue, vomiting, alopecia (hair loss), constipation, decreased appetite, anemia (hemoglobin in blood is below the reference range), decreased neutrophil count (white blood cells that help lead the body's immune system response to fight infection), diarrhea, leukopenia (other white blood cells that help the immune system), cough and decreased platelet count (component of blood whose function is to react to bleeding from blood vessel injury by clumping, thereby initiating a blood clot).

The prescribing information for trastuzumab deruxtecan includes a boxed warning about the risk of interstitial lung disease (a group of lung conditions that causes scarring of lung tissues) and embryo-fetal toxicity. Interstitial lung disease and pneumonitis, including cases resulting in death, have been reported with trastuzumab deruxtecan.

== History ==
The US Food and Drug Administration (FDA) approved trastuzumab deruxtecan based on the results of one clinical trial enrolling 184 female participants with HER2-positive, unresectable and/or metastatic breast cancer who had received two or more prior anti-HER2 therapies in the metastatic setting. These participants were heavily pretreated in the metastatic setting, receiving between two and 17 therapies prior to receiving trastuzumab deruxtecan. Participants in the clinical trial received trastuzumab deruxtecan every three weeks and tumor imaging was obtained every six weeks. The overall response rate was 60.3%, which reflects the percentage of participants who had a certain amount of tumor shrinkage with a median duration of response of 14.8 months.

Efficacy was evaluated in a multicenter, open-label, randomized trial (DESTINY-Gastric01, NCT03329690) in participants with HER2-positive locally advanced or metastatic gastric or GEJ adenocarcinoma who had progressed on at least two prior regimens, including trastuzumab, a fluoropyrimidine- and a platinum-containing chemotherapy. A total of 188 participants were randomized (2:1) to receive trastuzumab deruxtecan 6.4 mg/kg intravenously every three weeks or physician's choice of either irinotecan or paclitaxel monotherapy.

Efficacy was based on DESTINY-Breast03 (NCT03529110), a multicenter, open-label, randomized trial that enrolled 524 participants with HER2-positive, unresectable, and/or metastatic breast cancer who received prior trastuzumab and taxane therapy for metastatic disease or developed disease recurrence during or within six months of completing neoadjuvant or adjuvant therapy. Participants were randomized 1:1 to receive either trastuzumab deruxtecan or trastuzumab emtansine by intravenous infusion every three weeks until unacceptable toxicity or disease progression. Randomization was stratified by hormone receptor status, prior treatment with pertuzumab, and history of visceral disease.

The FDA approved trastuzumab deruxtecan for the treatment of HER2-low breast cancer based on DESTINY-Breast04, a randomized, multicenter, open label clinical trial that enrolled 557 adult participants with unresectable or metastatic HER2-low breast cancer. The trial included two cohorts: 494 hormone receptor positive (HR+) participants and 63 hormone receptor negative (HR-) participants. Of these participants, 373 randomly received trastuzumab deruxtecan by intravenous infusion every three weeks and 184 randomly received physician's choice of chemotherapy (eribulin, capecitabine, gemcitabine, nab paclitaxel, or paclitaxel). The results showed improvement in both progression-free survival and overall survival in people with unresectable or metastatic HER2-low breast cancer.

In September 2023, the UK's National Institute for Heath and Care Excellence (NICE) published guidance that it would not recommend Trastuzumab deruxtecan, to be used for treatment HER2 LOW breast cancer by the UK's National Heath Service (NHS), citing the cost of the drug being too high in comparison to its benefits. After talks with drug manufacturers AstraZeneca and Daiichi Sankyo, the NHS failed to negotiate a supply at what it deemed to be an acceptable price, and announced in March 2024 that the treatment would not be available to NHS patients. Roughly 1000 patients in the UK would have qualified for free treatment, had a supply been negotiated. Enhertu was however approved by The Scottish Medicines Consortium for use by NHS Scotland in December 2023. Trastuzumab deruxetecan remains funded for patients with HER2 positive advanced breast cancers.

== Society and culture ==
=== Legal status ===
The US Food and Drug Administration (FDA) approved trastuzumab deruxtecan in December 2019. The application for trastuzumab deruxtecan was granted accelerated approval, fast track designation, and breakthrough therapy designation. The FDA granted the approval of Enhertu to Daiichi Sankyo.

In December 2020, the Committee for Medicinal Products for Human Use of the European Medicines Agency adopted a positive opinion, recommending the granting of a conditional marketing authorization for the medicinal product Enhertu, intended for the treatment of metastatic HER2-positive breast cancer. Trastuzumab deruxtecan was reviewed under EMA's accelerated assessment program. The applicant for this medicinal product is Daiichi Sankyo Europe GmbH. Trastuzumab deruxtecan was approved for medical use in the European Union in January 2021.

In January 2021, the FDA granted accelerated approval to trastuzumab deruxtecan for the treatment of adults with locally advanced or metastatic HER2-positive gastric or gastroesophageal (GEJ) adenocarcinoma who have received a prior trastuzumab-based regimen.

In October 2021, the Australian Therapeutic Goods Administration approved trastuzumab deruxtecan for provisional registration indicated for the treatment of adults with unresectable or metastatic HER2-positive breast cancer who have received two or more prior anti HER2-based regimens.
