= FMS-like tyrosine kinase 3 ligand =

Protein-coding gene in the species Homo sapiens

FLT3LG
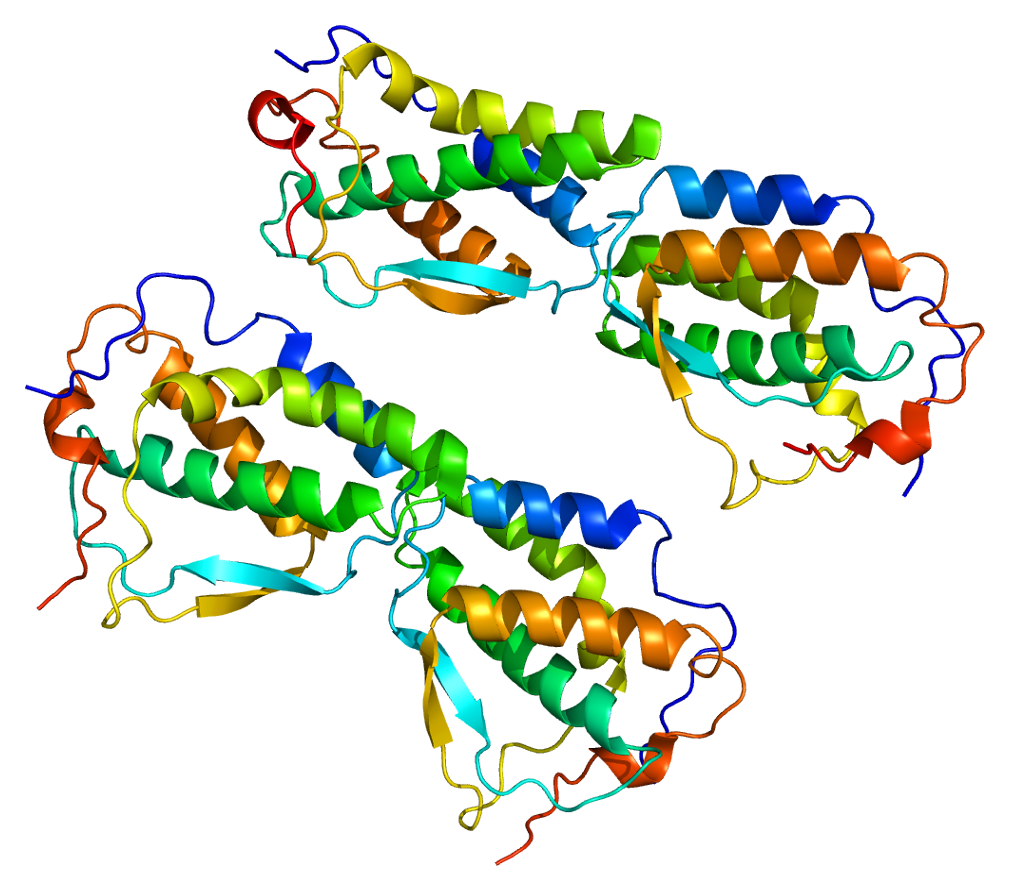

Identifiers
- Aliases: FLT3LG, FL, FLT3L, fms related tyrosine kinase 3 ligand, FLG3L, fms related receptor tyrosine kinase 3 ligand
- External IDs: OMIM: 600007; MGI: 95560; GeneCards: FLT3LG
Available structures
PDB	Ortholog search: PDBe RCSB
PDB	List of PDB id codes 1ETE, 3QS7, 3QS9

Gene location (Human)
Chr.	Chromosome 19 (human)
Band	19q13.33	Start	49,474,207 bp
Band	19q13.33	End	49,486,231 bp

Gene location (Mouse)
Chr.	Chromosome 7 (mouse)
Band	7 B3|7 29.14 cM	Start	45,129,788 bp
Band	7 B3|7 29.14 cM	End	45,136,432 bp
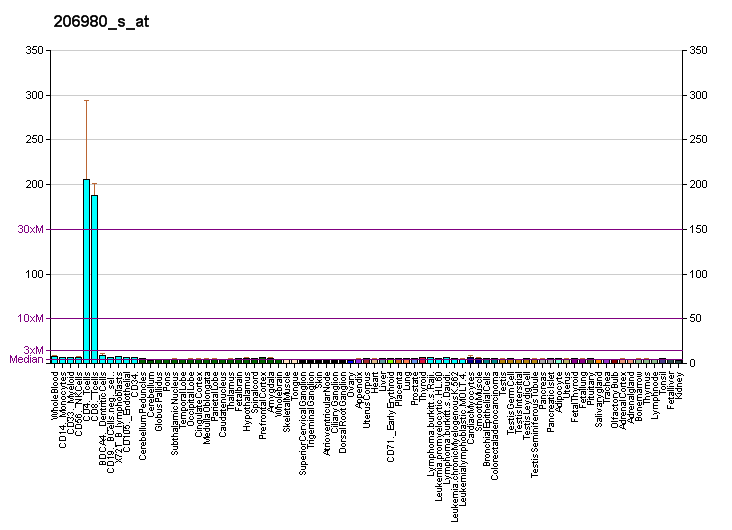

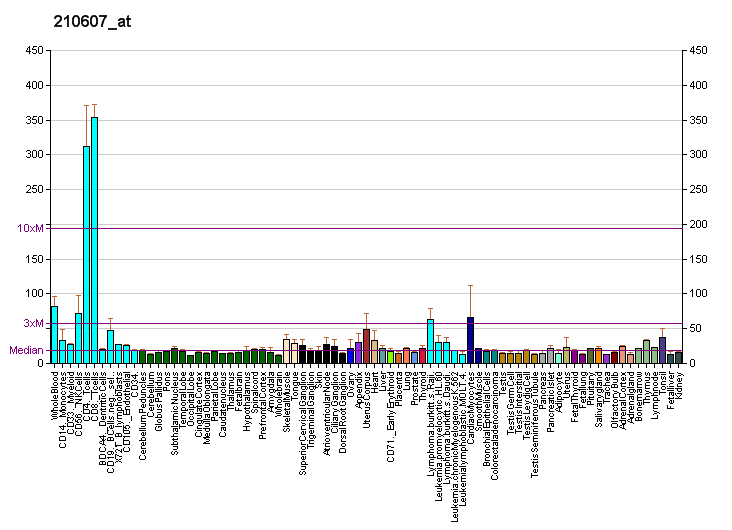
RNA expression pattern
Bgee	Human / Mouse (ortholog); Top expressed in: granulocyte; blood; lymph node; canal of the cervix; appendix; ectocervix; gastric mucosa; vagina; body of uterus; muscle layer of sigmoid colon / Top expressed in: bone marrow; spleen; granulocyte; islet of Langerhans; thymus; urinary bladder; lip; esophagus; jejunum; duodenum; More reference expression data
BioGPS	More reference expression data
Gene ontology
Molecular function	cytokine activity; protein homodimerization activity; receptor tyrosine kinase binding; signaling receptor binding; 1-phosphatidylinositol-3-kinase activity
Cellular component	integral component of membrane; membrane; intrinsic component of external side of plasma membrane; plasma membrane; cell surface; extracellular region; extracellular space; intracellular anatomical structure
Biological process	positive regulation of protein phosphorylation; positive regulation of natural killer cell differentiation; lymphocyte differentiation; positive regulation of cell proliferation in bone marrow; negative regulation of apoptotic process in bone marrow cell; positive regulation of myoblast fusion; positive regulation of cell cycle; positive regulation of myoblast differentiation; positive regulation of cell population proliferation; embryonic hemopoiesis; homeostasis of number of cells within a tissue; regulation of myeloid dendritic cell activation; signal transduction; positive regulation of transcription by RNA polymerase II; positive regulation of osteoclast proliferation; regulation of signaling receptor activity; cytokine-mediated signaling pathway; positive regulation of natural killer cell proliferation; MAPK cascade; phosphatidylinositol-3-phosphate biosynthetic process
Sources:Amigo / QuickGO
Orthologs
Databases	NCBI: entry; OMA: entry
Species	Human	Mouse
Entrez	2323	14256
Ensembl	ENSG00000090554	ENSMUSG00000110206
UniProt	P49771	P49772
RefSeq (mRNA)	NM_001204502; NM_001204503; NM_001278637; NM_001278638; NM_001459	NM_013520
RefSeq (protein)	NP_001191431; NP_001191432; NP_001265566; NP_001265567; NP_001450 NP_001191431.1	NP_038548; NP_001389760; NP_001389761; NP_001389762; NP_001389763 NP_001389764; NP_001389765; NP_001389766
Location (UCSC)	Chr 19: 49.47 – 49.49 Mb	Chr 7: 45.13 – 45.14 Mb
PubMed search
- Wikidata
View/Edit Human	View/Edit Mouse

Fms-related tyrosine kinase 3 ligand (FLT3LG) is a protein which in humans is encoded by the FLT3LG gene.

As a four-helical cytokine-like ligand, FLT3LG acts in the extracellular region and at the cell surface. The protein contains an Flt3 ligand domain and is associated with the membrane and plasma membrane. In synergy with other growth factors, Flt3 ligand stimulates the proliferation and differentiation of various blood cell progenitors. For example, it is a major growth factor stimulating the growth of dendritic cells.

FLT3L functions as a cytokine and growth factor that increases the number of immune cells (lymphocytes (B cells and T cells)) by activating the hematopoietic progenitors. It acts by binding to and activating FLT3 (CD135) which is found on what (in mice) are called multipotent progenitor (MPP) and common lymphoid progenitor (CLP) cells. It also induces the mobilization of the hematopoietic progenitors and stem cells in vivo which may help the system to kill cancer cells.

FLT3L is crucial for steady-state plasmacytoid dendritic cell (pDC) and classical dendritic cell (cDC) development. A lack of FLT3L results in low levels of dendritic cells.

== In parasite clearance ==
FLT3L and its receptor are involved in the mammalian immune response to malaria. In strains of plasmodium, FLT3L was shown to be released from mast cells and cause the expansion of dendritic cells, leading to the activation of CD8+ T cells. The same paper suggested that FLT3L release was caused by stimulation of mast cells with uric acid, produced from a precursor secreted by the plasmodium parasite.

== In immunotherapy ==
In situ vaccine (ISV), combining Flt3L, local radiotherapy, and a TLR3 agonist (poly-ICLC), could recruit, antigen-load and activate intratumoral cross-presenting dendritic cells (DCs) in indolent non-Hodgkin’s lymphomas (iNHLs) treatment (clinical trial: NCT01976585). In this study, intratumoral Flt3L was able to (1) induce the accumulation of large numbers of TLR3+ DCs in the tumor and (2) mediate, together with local irradiation, cross-presentation of TAA by DCs in vitro and in vivo.
