= Sacituzumab govitecan =

Antibody-drug conjugate

Monoclonal antibody
- Type: Whole antibody
- Source: Humanized (from mouse)
- Target: Trop-2

Clinical data
- Trade names: Trodelvy
- Other names: IMMU-132, hRS7-SN-38, sacituzumab govitecan-hziy
- AHFS/Drugs.com: Monograph
- MedlinePlus: a620034
- License data: US DailyMed: Sacituzumab govitecan
- Pregnancy category: AU: D; Contraindicated
- Routes of administration: Intravenous
- ATC code: L01FX17 (WHO)

Legal status
- Legal status: AU: S4 (Prescription only); CA: ℞-only / Schedule D; US: ℞-only; EU: Rx-only

Identifiers
- CAS Number: 1491917-83-9
- PubChem CID: 91668186
- DrugBank: DB12893
- ChemSpider: none
- UNII: M9BYU8XDQ6
- KEGG: D10985
- ChEMBL: ChEMBL3545262
- CompTox Dashboard (EPA): DTXSID401335985

Chemical and physical data
- Formula: C_{76}H_{104}N_{12}O_{24}S
- Molar mass: 1601.79 g·mol^{−1}
- 3D model (JSmol): Interactive image
- SMILES: CCC1=C2CN3C(=CC4=C(C3=O)COC(=O)C4(CC)OC(=O)OCC5=CC=C(C=C5)NC(=O)C(CCCCN)NC(=O)COCC(=O)NCCOCCOCCOCCOCCOCCOCCOCCOCCN6C=C(N=N6)CNC(=O)C7CCC(CC7)CN8C(=O)CC(C8=O)SCC(C(=O)O)N)C2=NC9=C1C=C(C=C9)O
- InChI: InChI=1S/C76H104N12O24S/c1-3-55-56-37-54(89)16-17-61(56)83-68-57(55)43-87-63(68)38-59-58(71(87)95)45-110-74(99)76(59,4-2)112-75(100)111-44-50-10-14-52(15-11-50)81-70(94)62(7-5-6-18-77)82-66(91)47-109-46-65(90)79-19-21-101-23-25-103-27-29-105-31-33-107-35-36-108-34-32-106-30-28-104-26-24-102-22-20-86-42-53(84-85-86)40-80-69(93)51-12-8-49(9-13-51)41-88-67(92)39-64(72(88)96)113-48-60(78)73(97)98/h10-11,14-17,37-38,42,49,51,60,62,64,89H,3-9,12-13,18-36,39-41,43-48,77-78H2,1-2H3,(H,79,90)(H,80,93)(H,81,94)(H,82,91)(H,97,98)/t49?,51?,60-,62-,64?,76-/m0/s1; Key:ULRUOUDIQPERIJ-PQURJYPBSA-N

Sacituzumab govitecan, sold under the brand name Trodelvy by Gilead Sciences, is a Trop-2-directed antibody and topoisomerase inhibitor drug conjugate used for the treatment of metastatic triple-negative breast cancer, previously treated metastatic hormone receptor–positive, HER2-negative breast cancer, and metastatic urothelial cancer.

The most common side effects include nausea, neutropenia, diarrhea, fatigue, anemia, vomiting, alopecia (hair loss), constipation, decreased appetite, rash and abdominal pain. Sacituzumab govitecan has a boxed warning about the risk of severe neutropenia (abnormally low levels of white blood cells) and severe diarrhea. Sacituzumab govitecan may cause harm to a developing fetus or newborn baby.

Sacituzumab govitecan was approved for medical use in the United States in April 2020, and in the European Union in November 2021. The U.S. Food and Drug Administration (FDA) and the European Medicines Agency (EMA) consider it to be a first-in-class medication.

== Medical uses ==
Sacituzumab govitecan is indicated for the treatment of unresectable locally advanced or metastatic triple-negative breast cancer (mTNBC) who have received two or more prior systemic therapies, at least one of them for metastatic disease; previously treated metastatic hormone receptor–positive, HER2-negative breast cancer; and locally advanced or metastatic urothelial cancer (mUC) who previously received a platinum-containing chemotherapy and either a programmed death receptor-1 (PD-1) or a programmed death-ligand 1 (PD-L1) inhibitor.

It is also indicated for the treatment of people with unresectable locally advanced or metastatic hormone receptor (HR)-positive, human epidermal growth factor receptor 2 (HER2)-negative (IHC 0, IHC 1+ or IHC 2+/ISH-) breast cancer who have received endocrine-based therapy and at least two additional systemic therapies in the metastatic setting.

== Mechanism ==
Sacituzumab govitecan is a conjugate of the humanized anti-Trop-2 monoclonal antibody linked with SN-38, the active metabolite of irinotecan. Each antibody having on average 7.6 molecules of SN-38 attached. Linkage to an antibody allows the drug to specifically target cells expressing Trop-2.

Sacituzumab govitecan is a Trop-2-directed antibody and topoisomerase inhibitor drug conjugate, meaning that the drug targets the Trop-2 receptor that helps the cancer grow, divide and spread, and is linked to topoisomerase inhibitor, which is a chemical compound that is toxic to cancer cells. Approximately two of every ten breast cancer diagnoses worldwide are triple-negative. Triple-negative breast cancer is a type of breast cancer that tests negative for estrogen receptors, progesterone receptors and human epidermal growth factor receptor 2 (HER2) protein. Therefore, triple-negative breast cancer does not respond to hormonal therapy medicines or medicines that target HER2.

== Development ==
Immunomedics announced in 2013, that it had received fast track designation from the US Food and Drug Administration (FDA) for the compound as a potential treatment for non-small cell lung cancer, small cell lung cancer, and metastatic triple-negative breast cancer. Orphan drug status was granted for small cell lung cancer and pancreatic cancer. In February 2016, Immunomedics announced that sacituzumab govitecan had received an FDA breakthrough therapy designation (a classification designed to expedite the development and review of drugs that are intended, alone or in combination with one or more other drugs, to treat a serious or life-threatening disease or condition) for the treatment of people with triple-negative breast cancer who have failed at least two other prior therapies for metastatic disease.

== History ==
Sacituzumab govitecan was added to the proposed International nonproprietary name (INN) list in 2015, and to the recommended list in 2016.

Sacituzumab govitecan-hziy was approved for medical use in the United States in April 2020.

Sacituzumab govitecan-hziy was approved based on the results of IMMU-132-01, a multicenter, single-arm clinical trial (NCT01631552) of 108 participants with metastatic triple-negative breast cancer who had received at least two prior treatments for metastatic disease. Of the 108 participants involved within the study, 107 were female and 1 was male. Participants received sacituzumab govitecan-hziy at a dose of 10 milligrams per kilogram of body weight intravenously on days one and eight every 21 days. Treatment with sacituzumab govitecan-hziy was continued until disease progression or unacceptable toxicity. Tumor imaging was obtained every eight weeks. The efficacy of sacituzumab govitecan-hziy was based on the overall response rate (ORR) – which reflects the percentage of participants that had a certain amount of tumor shrinkage. The ORR was 33.3% (95% confidence interval [CI], 24.6 to 43.1). Additionally, with the 33.3% of study participants who achieved a response, 2.8% of participants experienced complete responses. The median time to response in participants was 2.0 months (range, 1.6 to 13.5), the median duration of response was 7.7 months (95% confidence interval [CI], 4.9 to 10.8), the median progression free survival was 5.5 months, and the median overall survival was 13.0 months. Of the participants that achieved an objective response to sacituzumab govitecan-hziy, 55.6% maintained their response for six or more months and 16.7% maintained their response for twelve or more months.

Sacituzumab govitecan-hziy was granted accelerated approval along with priority review, breakthrough therapy, and fast track designations. The U.S. Food and Drug Administration (FDA) granted approval of Trodelvy to Immunomedics, Inc.

In April 2021, the FDA granted regular approval to sacituzumab govitecan for people with unresectable locally advanced or metastatic triple-negative breast cancer (mTNBC) who have received two or more prior systemic therapies, at least one of them for metastatic disease. Efficacy and safety were evaluated in a multicenter, open-label, randomized trial (ASCENT; NCT02574455) conducted in 529 participants with unresectable locally advanced or mTNBC who had relapsed after at least two prior chemotherapies, one of which could be in the neoadjuvant or adjuvant setting, if progression occurred within twelve months. Participants were randomized (1:1) to receive sacituzumab govitecan, 10 mg/kg as an intravenous infusion, on days 1 and 8 of a 21-day (n=267) cycle or physician's choice of single agent chemotherapy (n=262).

In April 2021, the FDA granted accelerated approval to sacituzumab govitecan for people with locally advanced or metastatic urothelial cancer (mUC) who previously received a platinum-containing chemotherapy and either a programmed death receptor-1 (PD-1) or a programmed death-ligand 1 (PD-L1) inhibitor. Efficacy and safety were evaluated in TROPHY (IMMU-132-06; NCT03547973), a single-arm, multicenter trial that enrolled 112 participants with locally advanced or mUC who received prior treatment with a platinum-containing chemotherapy and either a PD-1 or PD-L1 inhibitor.

In February 2023, the FDA approved sacituzumab govitecan for people with unresectable locally advanced or metastatic hormone receptor (HR)-positive, human epidermal growth factor receptor 2 (HER2)-negative (IHC 0, IHC 1+ or IHC 2+/ISH-) breast cancer who have received endocrine-based therapy and at least two additional systemic therapies in the metastatic setting.

== Society and culture ==
=== Legal status ===
On 14 October 2021, the Committee for Medicinal Products for Human Use (CHMP) of the European Medicines Agency (EMA) adopted a positive opinion, recommending the granting of a marketing authorization for the medicinal product Trodelvy, intended for the treatment of unresectable or metastatic triple-negative breast cancer. The applicant for this medicinal product is Gilead Sciences Ireland UC. Sacituzumab govitecan was approved for medical use in the European Union in November 2021.
