= Gelesis100 =

- Other names: Plenity; Oral superabsorbent hydrogel

Gelesis100, sold under the brand name Plenity, is an oral hydrogel used to treat overweight and obesity. It absorbs water and expands in the stomach and small bowel thereby increasing feelings of fullness. Possible side effects include primarily gastrointestinal symptoms, such as diarrhea, abdominal distention, infrequent bowel movements, constipation, abdominal pain, and flatulence. It is contraindicated in pregnancy, chronic malabsorption syndromes, and cholestasis. The US Food and Drug Administration approved it in 2019 as a medical device. Gelesis100 was developed by the company Gelesis.

== History ==
The US Food and Drug Administration approved the use of Gelesis100 in April 2019 as a medical device. On January 19, 2024, Plenity received authorization from the U.S. Food and Drug Administration to be marketed over the counter without a prescription. Gelesis100 is the first treatment of its kind for overweight and obesity. In 2022, the American Gastroenterology Association published a guideline for the management of obesity, which recommended the use of Gelesis100 be limited to clinical trials due to limited evidence.

== Uses and effectiveness ==
Gelesis100 is used to treat obesity and overweight as an anti-obesity medication. Gelesis100 is taken as a pill before meals with water.

Gelesis100 has been criticized for its small impact on weight loss relative to side effects.

== Mechanism and physiology ==
Gelesis100 is an oral superabsorbent hydrogel, which is produced from carboxymethylcellulose and citric acid. The cross-linked product forms a hydrophilic matrix, which absorbs water. Taken in capsule form by mouth, as Gelesis100 absorbs water, it expands in the stomach and small intestine. After absorbing water, a semisolid gel structure forms, which may promote satiety and result in weight loss via reduced caloric intake.

== Contraindications ==
Gelesis100 is contraindicated in pregnancy, chronic malabsorption syndromes, and cholestasis.

== Side effects ==
Side effects consist of minor gastrointestinal symptoms, including diarrhea, abdominal distention, infrequent bowel movements, constipation, abdominal pain, and flatulence. Gelesis100 is not associated with any severe adverse events. However, long-term safety data beyond 24 weeks is not available.
