= Radiofrequency targeted vertebral augmentation =

Radiofrequency targeted vertebral augmentation (also written as RF-TVA) is a form of kyphoplasty that uses radiofrequency heat to control the viscosity of polymethylmethacrylate cement and deliver it into the vertebral body to treat vertebral compression fractures.

== Procedure ==
Radiofrequency targeted vertebral augmentation is a minimally invasive procedure designed to preserve good bone while performing vertebral augmentation (sometimes referred to as kyphoplasty). With traditional kyphoplasty, a balloon is used to create a space within the cancellous bone and then cement is injected into the space. The RF-TVA procedure is different in that a physician directs a small navigational canula into the vertebra and creates a small pathways for the cement as opposed to using a balloon. This process preserves more of the healthy canncellous bone. The pathways are then filled with ultra-high viscosity bone cement which then permeates into the surrounding bone, stabilizing the fracture and restoring vertebral height. As of 2014, the system has been used to treat more than 15,000 spinal fractures worldwide.

== History ==
RF-TVA was first developed by DFINE, Inc., a medical device company based in San Jose, California. Its product, the StabiliT Vertebral Augmentation System received 510(k) clearance from the United States Food and Drug Administration in 2008 and is CE marked for commercial sale in Europe.

== See also ==
- Intervertebral disc
- Minimal invasive spine surgery
- Osteoporosis
