= Targeted radiofrequency ablation =

- Other names: t-RFA
- Specialty: Oncology

Targeted radiofrequency ablation (also written t-RFA) is a minimally invasive procedure to treat severe pain and discomfort caused from metastatic tumors in the vertebral body of the spine. This procedure uses radiofrequency energy to target and ablate a specific spinal tumor, causing it shrink and reduce the pressure on the surrounding nerves and tissues. The procedure minimizes damage to the vertebrae and surrounding tissues. It is used as a palliative therapy rather with the intention of treating the cancer itself.

== History ==
Targeted radiofrequency ablation was first developed by DFINE, Inc., a medical device company based in San Jose, California. Its product, the STAR Tumor Ablation System received 510(k) clearance from the United States Food and Drug Administration in August 2010. It is cleared for sale in the US and CE marked in Europe. The procedure was first performed at the James Graham Brown Cancer Center located at the University of Louisville Hospital in March 2012.

== Procedure ==
Targeted radiofrequency ablation is not a treatment for cancer, but is used for pain management. It is usually an outpatient procedure using local anesthesia through a small incision. t-RFA uses a small steerable device that is placed into the vertebra, navigated by a physician to the targeted tumor. The physician can then deliver the energy to heat and destroy metastatic spinal tumor cells. The procedure minimizes damage to surrounding tissue and vital structures and has been shown to provide pain relief in a single treatment.

== Efficacy ==
A 2013 study published in the Journal of NeuroInterventional Surgery showed that t-RFA was an effective method of pain relief with low morbidity. Patients in the study also reduced their requirements of pain relieving drugs after receiving the treatment and also regained the ability to perform movements that they were previously restricted from due to the pain. Another 2013 study published in the Journal of Vascular and Interventional Radiology showed that patients receiving the procedure had reduced pain where traditional treatment methods were unsuccessful. A third study published in 2013 showed that t-RFA allowed treatment of lesions that were not controlled by either radiation therapy or systemic therapy. A 2014 study published in the Journal of Vascular and Interventional Radiology showed a decrease in tumor volume and metabolic activity in all 34 patients who received the treatment.

The ability to provide localized t-RFA of metastatic lesions of the spine may provide rapid and lasting pain relief, enabling patients to restore their quality of life with minimal, if any, delay in systemic, curative therapy of their primary cancer. As compared to radiation, which often requires multiple visits, the procedure provides patients with pain relief from metastatic spinal tumors in a single, minimally invasive treatment. The STAR System potentially minimizes additional VCFs due to radiation related bone fragility as well as the side effects of radiation.

This procedure can be performed in addition to chemotherapy, radiation therapy or other therapies that are ongoing to treat the primary cancer often allowing the patient the tolerance to continue their therapy.

== See also ==
- Spinal tumor
- Invasiveness of surgical procedures
- Interventional pain management
