= NK012 =

NK012 is a 'nanodevice' formulation of SN-38 (an irinotecan metabolite). NK012 is an SN-38-releasing polymeric micelle constructed by covalently attaching SN-38 to the block copolymer PEG-PGlu, followed by self-assembly of amphiphilic block copolymers in aqueous media.

It has completed phase II clinical trials for triple-negative breast cancer and relapsed small cell lung cancer. In 2016, Nippon Kayaku received orphan drug designation for NK012 from the US FDA. This means that if it is approved in the United States, Nippon Kayaku will be entitled to 7 years of market exclusivity. This is intended to incentivize future development, but does not mean the drug has been approved.

== See also ==
- Nanomedicine
- Targeted drug delivery
