= Superprism =

Type of crystal

A superprism is a photonic crystal in which an entering beam of light will lead to an extremely large angular dispersion. The ability of the photonic crystal to send optical beams with different wavelengths to considerably different angles in space in superprisms has been used to demonstrate wavelength demultiplexing in these structures. The first superprism also modified group velocity rather than phase velocity in order to achieve the "superprism phenomena". This effect was interpreted as anisotropic dispersion in contrast to an isotropic dispersion. Furthermore, the two beams of light appear to show negative bending within the crystal.

== See also ==
- Superlens
- Prism (optics)
- Metamaterial
- Perfect mirror
