= Patritumab deruxtecan =

Antibody-drug conjugate

Clinical data
- Other names: MK-1022
- ATC code: L01FX36 (WHO)

Identifiers
- CAS Number: 2227102-46-5
- UNII: 3XPI7EG4W8

Patritumab deruxtecan (U3-1402/ MK-1022) is an experimental antibody–drug conjugate developed by Merck and Daiichi Sankyo to treat non-small-cell lung cancer.
