= Daphne Zohar =

American entrepreneur

Daphne Zohar is an American entrepreneur. She is the founder and CEO of Seaport Therapeutics, co-founder of Karuna Therapeutics, and Founding CEO of PureTech Health. She sits on the board of BIO and is a co-founder and host of Biotech Hangout.

She was named one of the most influential people in Biopharma in 2023. MIT Technology Review TR35 top innovators . by BioWorld, as one of 28 leaders predicted to be the "movers and shakers" of the biotechnology industry over the next twenty years. That same year, Zohar was also featured as one of “The Boston Area’s Top 15 Innovators” by The Boston Globe and in 2013, Scott Kirsner of The Boston Globe named Zohar one of the 10 most influential women in biotech.
