= CDH6 =

Protein-coding gene in humans

Identifiers
- Aliases: CDH6, CAD6, KCAD, cadherin 6
- External IDs: OMIM: 603007; MGI: 107435; GeneCards: CDH6
Available structures
PDB	Ortholog search: PDBe RCSB
PDB	List of PDB id codes 3LND

Gene location (Human)
Chr.	Chromosome 5 (human)
Band	5p13.3	Start	31,193,686 bp
Band	5p13.3	End	31,329,146 bp

Gene location (Mouse)
Chr.	Chromosome 15 (mouse)
Band	15|15 A1	Start	13,028,787 bp
Band	15|15 A1	End	13,173,761 bp
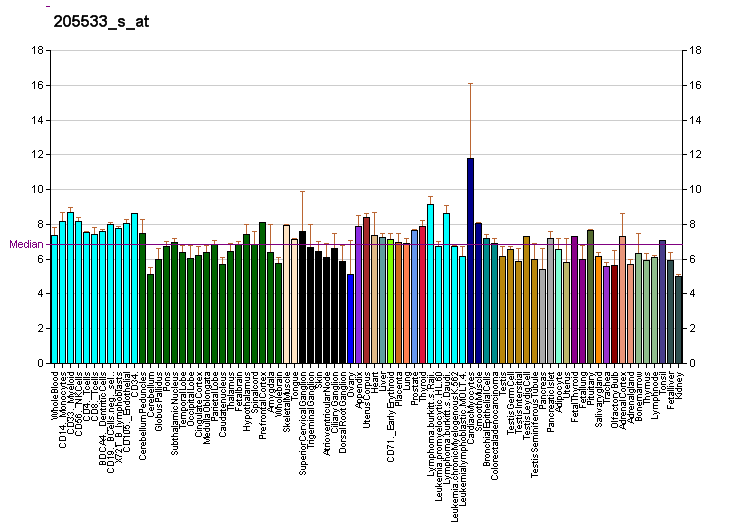

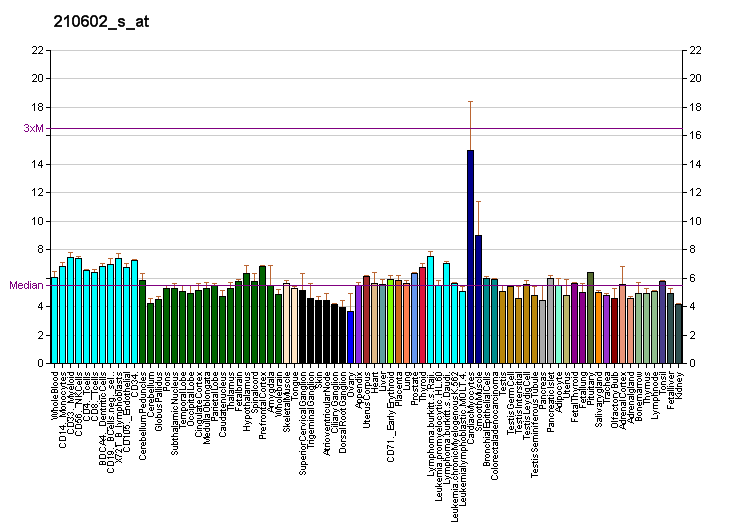

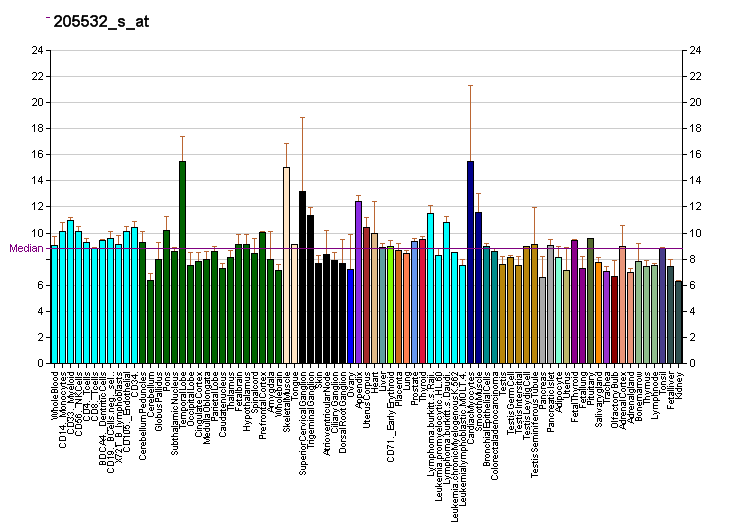
RNA expression pattern
Bgee	Human / Mouse (ortholog); Top expressed in: beta cell; kidney tubule; tibial arteries; human kidney; endothelial cell; vena cava; gallbladder; sural nerve; lateral nuclear group of thalamus; metanephric glomerulus / Top expressed in: internal carotid artery; external carotid artery; hair follicle; ascending aorta; aortic valve; Rostral migratory stream; renal corpuscle; efferent ductule; ciliary body; iris; More reference expression data
BioGPS	More reference expression data
Gene ontology
Molecular function	calcium ion binding; metal ion binding; cytoskeletal protein binding; protein homodimerization activity; cadherin binding
Cellular component	integral component of membrane; plasma membrane; membrane; cell surface; catenin complex
Biological process	Notch signaling pathway; cell adhesion; adherens junction organization; homophilic cell adhesion via plasma membrane adhesion molecules; cell-cell junction assembly; calcium-dependent cell-cell adhesion via plasma membrane cell adhesion molecules; cell-cell adhesion mediated by cadherin; cell-cell adhesion; cell morphogenesis
Sources:Amigo / QuickGO
Orthologs
Databases	NCBI: entry; OMA: entry
Species	Human	Mouse
Entrez	1004	12563
Ensembl	ENSG00000113361	ENSMUSG00000039385
UniProt	P55285	P97326
RefSeq (mRNA)	NM_004932; NM_001362435	NM_007666
RefSeq (protein)	NP_004923; NP_001349364	NP_031692
Location (UCSC)	Chr 5: 31.19 – 31.33 Mb	Chr 15: 13.03 – 13.17 Mb
PubMed search
- Wikidata
View/Edit Human	View/Edit Mouse

Cadherin-6 is a protein that in humans is encoded by the CDH6 gene.

This gene encodes a type II classical cadherin from the cadherin superfamily. The encoded membrane protein is a calcium dependent cell–cell adhesion glycoprotein composed of five extracellular cadherin repeats, a transmembrane region and a highly conserved cytoplasmic tail. Cadherins mediate cell–cell binding in a homophilic manner, contributing to the sorting of heterogeneous cell types and the maintenance of orderly structures such as epithelium. Strong transcriptional expression of this gene has been observed in hepatocellular and renal carcinoma cell lines, suggesting a possible role in metastasis and invasion.
