= TOP1 =

DNA topoisomerase enzyme

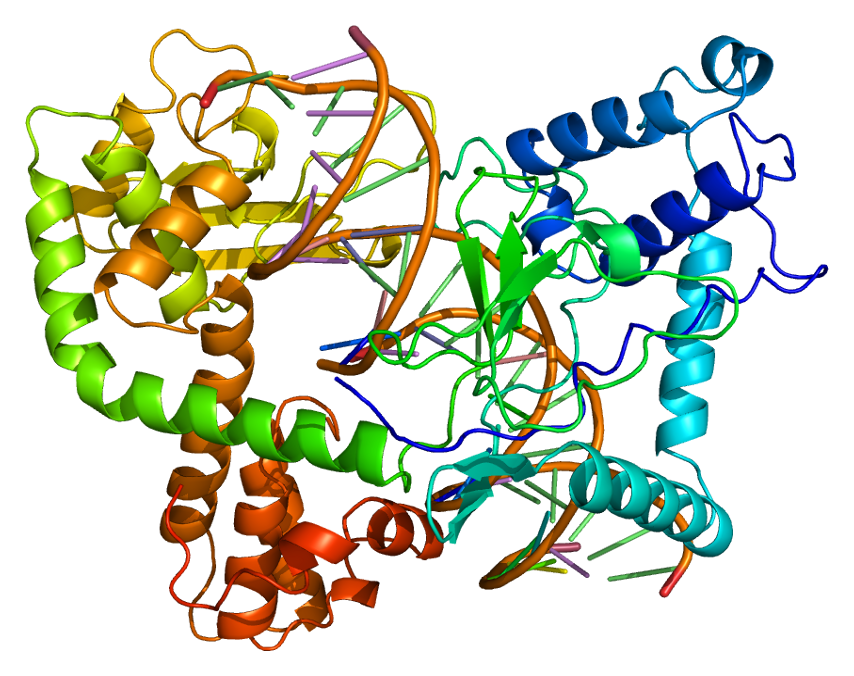

Identifiers
- Aliases: TOP1, TOPI, topoisomerase (DNA) I, DNA topoisomerase I
- External IDs: OMIM: 126420; MGI: 98788; GeneCards: TOP1
Available structures
PDB	Ortholog search: PDBe RCSB
PDB	List of PDB id codes 1A31, 1A35, 1A36, 1EJ9, 1K4S, 1K4T, 1LPQ, 1NH3, 1R49, 1RR8, 1RRJ, 1SC7, 1SEU, 1T8I, 1TL8
Enzyme activity
EC #	BRENDA	ExPASy	KEGG	MetaCyc
5.6.2.1	↗	↗	↗	↗

Gene location (Human)
Chr.	Chromosome 20 (human)
Band	20q12	Start	41,028,822 bp
Band	20q12	End	41,124,487 bp

Gene location (Mouse)
Chr.	Chromosome 2 (mouse)
Band	2 H2|2 80.96 cM	Start	160,487,808 bp
Band	2 H2|2 80.96 cM	End	160,564,684 bp
RNA expression pattern
Bgee	Human / Mouse (ortholog); Top expressed in: oocyte; ventricular zone; ganglionic eminence; secondary oocyte; pericardium; pylorus; vena cava; pancreatic ductal cell; superior surface of tongue; monocyte / Top expressed in: Ileal epithelium; zygote; secondary oocyte; maxillary prominence; mandibular prominence; tail of embryo; human fetus; genital tubercle; ventricular zone; ganglionic eminence; More reference expression data
BioGPS	n/a
Gene ontology
Molecular function	DNA topoisomerase type I (single strand cut, ATP-independent) activity; chromatin binding; isomerase activity; DNA topoisomerase activity; core promoter sequence-specific DNA binding; protein binding; RNA binding; DNA binding; double-stranded DNA binding; single-stranded DNA binding; protein serine/threonine kinase activity; ATP binding; protein domain specific binding; supercoiled DNA binding; RNA polymerase II cis-regulatory region sequence-specific DNA binding
Cellular component	cytoplasm; perikaryon; P-body; replication fork protection complex; chromosome; nuclear chromosome; nucleus; fibrillar center; nucleoplasm; nucleolus; DNA topoisomerase type II (double strand cut, ATP-hydrolyzing) complex; protein-DNA complex
Biological process	chromatin remodeling; embryonic cleavage; programmed cell death; phosphorylation; rhythmic process; chromosome segregation; protein sumoylation; circadian regulation of gene expression; DNA replication; circadian rhythm; viral process; DNA topological change; peptidyl-serine phosphorylation
Sources:Amigo / QuickGO
Orthologs
Databases	NCBI: entry; OMA: entry
Species	Human	Mouse
Entrez	7150	21969
Ensembl	ENSG00000198900	ENSMUSG00000070544
UniProt	P11387	Q04750
RefSeq (mRNA)	NM_003286	NM_009408
RefSeq (protein)	NP_003277	NP_033434
Location (UCSC)	Chr 20: 41.03 – 41.12 Mb	Chr 2: 160.49 – 160.56 Mb
PubMed search
- Wikidata
View/Edit Human	View/Edit Mouse

DNA topoisomerase 1 is an enzyme that in humans is encoded by the TOP1 gene. It is a DNA topoisomerase, an enzyme that catalyzes the transient breaking and rejoining of a single strand of DNA.

== Function ==
This gene encodes a DNA topoisomerase, an enzyme that controls and alters the topologic states of DNA during transcription. This enzyme catalyzes the transient breaking and rejoining of a single strand of DNA which lets the broken strand rotate around the intact strand, thus altering the topology of DNA. This gene is localized to chromosome 20 and has pseudogenes which reside on chromosomes 1 and 22.

== Mechanism ==
As reviewed by Champoux, the type IB topoisomerases, including TOP1, form a covalent intermediate in which the active site tyrosine becomes attached to the 3' phosphate end of the cleaved strand rather than the 5' phosphate end.

The eukaryotic topoisomerases I were found to nick the DNA with a preference for a sequence of nucleotides that extends from positions -4 to -1 from the nick. The preferred nucleotides in the strand to be cut are 5'-(A/T)(G/C)(A/T)T-3' with the enzyme covalently attached to the -1 T residue, though sometimes a C residue is found at the -1 position.

The TOP1 protein of humans has been subdivided into four regions. The N-terminal 214 amino acids are dispensable for relaxation of supercoiling activity in vitro and there are four nuclear localization signals and sites for interaction with other cellular proteins within the N-terminal domain. The N-terminal domain is followed by a highly conserved, 421 amino acid core domain containing all of the catalytic residues except the active site tyrosine. This is followed by a poorly conserved linker domain of 77 amino acids. Finally there is a 53 amino acid C-terminal domain. The active site Tyr723 is found within the C-terminal domain.

As further summarized by Pommier and by Seol et al., TOP1 breaks the DNA by a transesterification reaction using the active site tyrosine as the nucleophile that attacks the DNA phosphodiester backbone. After the TOP1 covalently attaches to the 3' end of the broken strand, supercoiling of the DNA is relaxed by controlled rotation of DNA about the intact strand. Then the 5' hydroxyl end of the broken DNA strand can reverse the phosphotyrosyl bond, enabling the release of TOP1 and religation of the DNA. The nicking and closing reactions are fast, and about 100 cycles can occur per second.

== Inhibition ==
The briefly attached, covalently bonded TOP1-DNA structure at the 3' end of a cleaved DNA single strand is called a TOP1-DNA cleavage complex, or TOP1cc. The TOP1cc is a specific target of TOP1 inhibitors. One of the first inhibitors shown to target TOP1 is irinotecan. Irinotecan is an analogue of the cytotoxic natural alkaloid camptothecin, obtained from the Chinese tree Camptotheca acuminata. Irinotecan is especially effective through its metabolic product SN-38. Irinotecan and SN-38 act by trapping a subset of TOP1-DNA cleavage complexes, those with a guanine +1 in the DNA sequence. One irinotecan or SN-38 molecule stacks against the base pairs flanking the topoisomerase-induced cleavage site and poisons (inactivates) the TOP1 enzyme. The article Camptothecin lists other analogues of camptothecin and the article Topoisomerase inhibitor lists other compounds which inhibit TOP1.

== Cancer ==
Since 1985, TOP1 has been known as a target for the treatment of human cancers. Camptothecin analogues irinotecan and topotecan, which inhibit TOP1, are among the most effective FDA-approved anticancer chemotherapeutic agents used in clinical practice. Higher expression of TOP1 in KRAS mutant non-small cell lung cancer and correlation to survival suggests that TOP1 inhibitors might have increased benefit when administered to treat patients with a KRAS mutant tumor.

=== Synthetic lethality ===
Synthetic lethality arises when a combination of deficiencies in the expression of two or more genes leads to cell death, whereas a deficiency in only one of these genes does not. The deficiencies can arise through mutation, epigenetic alteration or by inhibition of a gene's expression.

Irinotecan inactivation of TOP1 appears to be synthetically lethal in combination with deficiencies in expression of some specific DNA repair genes.

Irinotecan inactivation of TOP1 was synthetically lethal with deficient expression of the DNA repair WRN gene in patients with colon cancer. In a 2006 study, 45 patients had colonic tumors with hypermethylated WRN gene promoters (silenced WRN expression), and 43 patients had tumors with unmethylated WRN gene promoters, so that WRN protein expression was high. Irinotecan was more strongly beneficial for patients with hypermethylated WRN promoters (39.4 months survival) than for those with unmethylated WRN promoters (20.7 months survival). The WRN gene promoter is hypermethylated in about 38% of colorectal cancers.

Irinotecan inactivation of TOP1 may be synthetically lethal with deficient expression of DNA repair gene MRE11. A recent study was carried out with 1,264 patients with stage III colon cancer. The patients were treated with a postoperative weekly adjuvant bolus of 5-fluorouracil/leucovorin (FU/LV) or else with irinotecan+FU/LV and were followed up for 8 years. Eleven percent of the tumors were deficient for DNA repair enzyme MRE11 due to a deletion of a string of thymidines in the DNA sequence of the MRE11 gene. The addition of irinotecan to FU/LV in the treatment protocol resulted in MRE11-deficient patients having better long-term disease free survival than patients with wild-type MRE11 (though the effect was small), indicating some degree of synthetic lethality between irinotecan-induced TOP1 inactivation and MRE11 deficiency.

There are a number of pre-clinical studies indicating synthetic lethality of irinotecan with other genetic or epigenetic DNA repair deficiencies common in cancers. For instance, the DNA repair gene ATM is frequently hypermethylated (silenced) in many cancers (see hypermethylation of ATM in cancers). A 2016 study showed that low expression of the ATM protein in gastric cancer cells in vitro and in a mouse model caused increased sensitivity to inactivation by irinotecan compared to cells with high expression of ATM. This indicates synthetic lethality of ATM deficiency with irinotecan-mediated TOP1 deficiency.

Another pre-clinical effort was a screening study to find a compound that would be synthetically lethal with a deficiency of N-myc downstream regulated gene 1 (NDRG1) expression. NDRG1 is a metastasis-suppressor gene in prostate cancer, and appears to have a role in DNA repair. Screening of 3360 compounds revealed that irinotecan-mediated TOP1 deficiency (and one other compound, cetrimonium bromide) exhibit synthetic lethality with NDRG1 deficiency in prostate cancer cells.

== DNA repair ==
Exposure of human HeLA cells to UVB irradiation specifically stimulates the formation of covalent complexes between topoisomerase I and DNA. Topoisomerase I appears to have a direct role in nucleotide excision repair, a process that removes UVB-induced, and other, DNA damages.

== Interactions ==
TOP1 has been shown to interact with:

- ASF/SF2,
- BTBD1,
- BTBD2,
- Nucleolin,
- P53, and
- UBE2I.

== See also ==
- Type I topoisomerase
- Topoisomerase
