= Growthworks =

Canadian venture capital firm

GrowthWorks Capital Ltd
- Type: Private
- Genre: Venture capital
- Founded: 1992; 34 years ago
- Headquarters: Canada
- AUM: C$170 million
- Website: www.growthworks.ca

GrowthWorks Capital Ltd is a Canadian venture capital firm investing in early-stage technology companies. Founded in 1992, the Working Opportunity Fund has invested $600 million in 130 BC technology companies.

The GrowthWorks management team has won the CVCA Deal of the Year award 3 times (Layer 7 – 2013, Galleon Energy – 2007, HotHaus Technologies – 2000). The reinstatement of the 15% federal Labour Sponsored Venture Capital tax credit in Budget 2016 (plus the existing Provincial tax credits), will be beneficial to GrowthWorks. In 2013, it was reported that the fund had liquidity problems.
