= TACSTD2 =

Protein-coding gene in humans

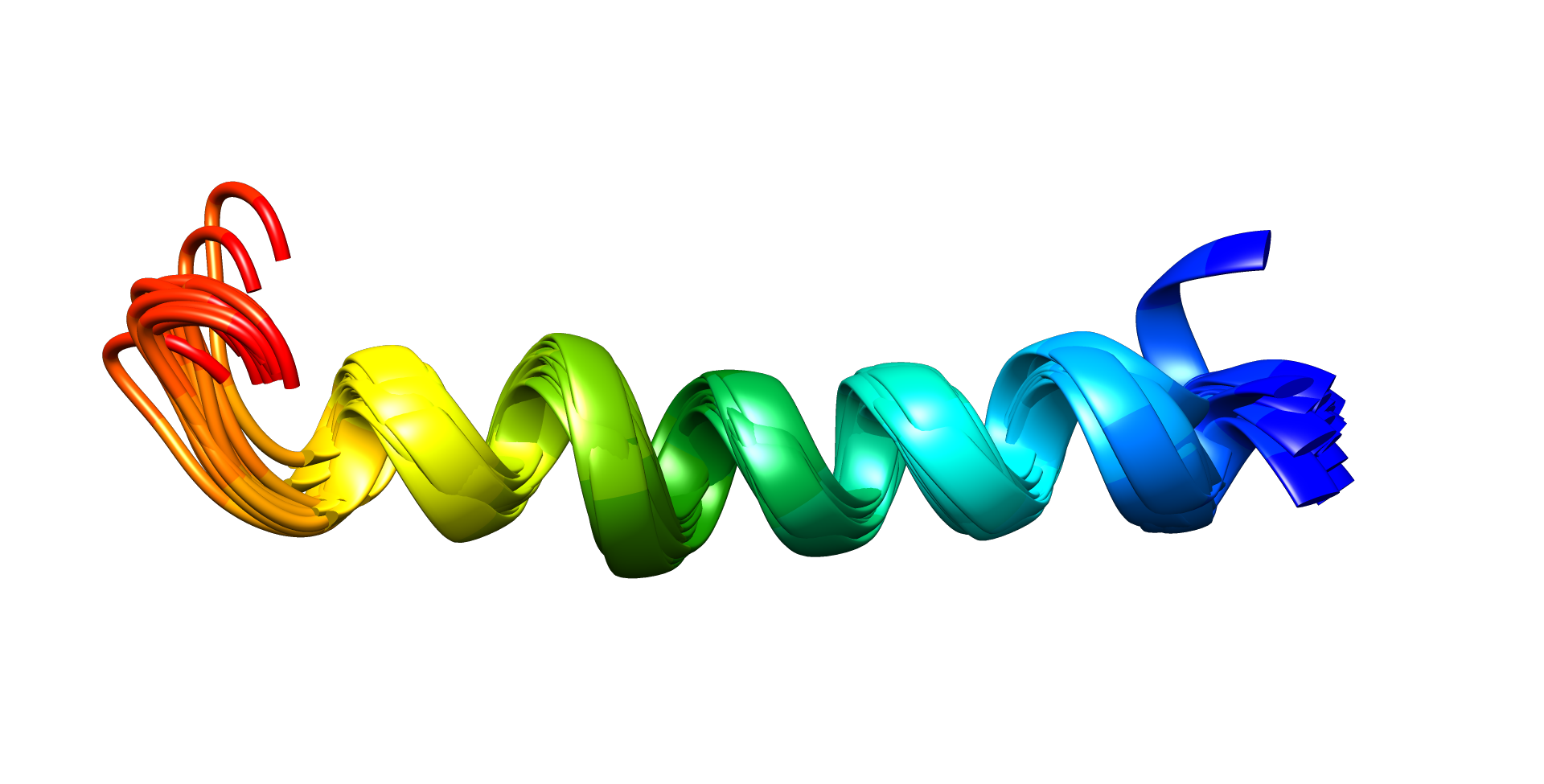

Identifiers
- Aliases: TACSTD2, EGP-1, EGP1, GA733-1, GA7331, GP50, M1S1, TROP2, tumor-associated calcium signal transducer 2, tumor associated calcium signal transducer 2
- External IDs: OMIM: 137290; MGI: 1861606; GeneCards: TACSTD2
Available structures
PDB	Ortholog search: PDBe RCSB
PDB	List of PDB id codes 2MAE, 2MVK, 2MVL

Gene location (Human)
Chr.	Chromosome 1 (human)
Band	1p32.1	Start	58,575,433 bp
Band	1p32.1	End	58,577,252 bp

Gene location (Mouse)
Chr.	Chromosome 6 (mouse)
Band	6|6 C1	Start	67,511,046 bp
Band	6|6 C1	End	67,512,780 bp
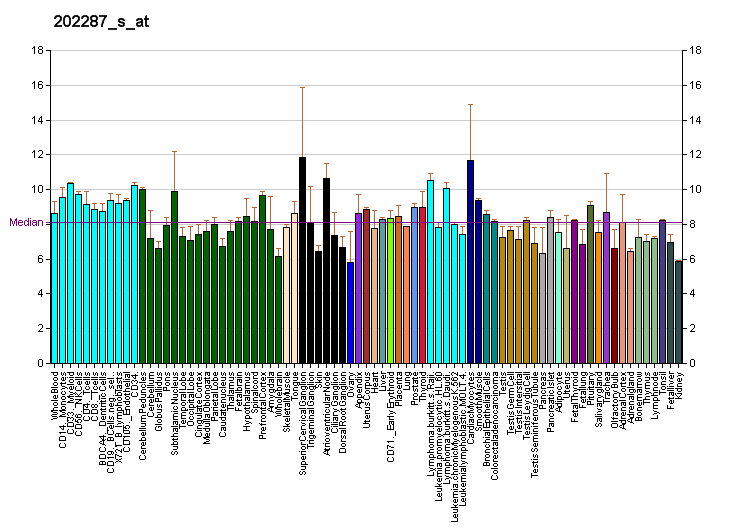

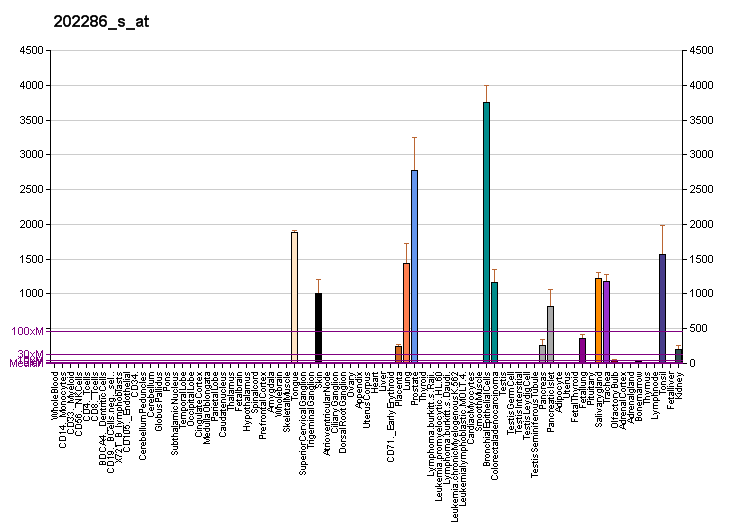
RNA expression pattern
Bgee	Human / Mouse (ortholog); Top expressed in: palpebral conjunctiva; mucosa of pharynx; nasal epithelium; bronchial epithelial cell; amniotic fluid; oral cavity; gingival epithelium; skin of thigh; human penis; epithelium of nasopharynx / Top expressed in: corneal stroma; lip; esophagus; skin of back; urothelium; skin of external ear; transitional epithelium of urinary bladder; cervix; granulocyte; skin of abdomen; More reference expression data
BioGPS	More reference expression data
Gene ontology
Molecular function	protein binding; signaling receptor activity; cadherin binding involved in cell-cell adhesion
Cellular component	integral component of membrane; cytosol; lateral plasma membrane; membrane; plasma membrane; integral component of plasma membrane; basal plasma membrane; extracellular exosome; nucleus; extracellular space; bicellular tight junction
Biological process	ureteric bud morphogenesis; response to stimulus; negative regulation of ruffle assembly; negative regulation of cell motility; cell surface receptor signaling pathway; negative regulation of branching involved in ureteric bud morphogenesis; cell population proliferation; regulation of epithelial cell proliferation; negative regulation of stress fiber assembly; negative regulation of substrate adhesion-dependent cell spreading; negative regulation of epithelial cell migration; visual perception; cell-cell adhesion; positive regulation of stem cell differentiation
Sources:Amigo / QuickGO
Orthologs
Databases	NCBI: entry; OMA: entry
Species	Human	Mouse
Entrez	4070	56753
Ensembl	ENSG00000184292	ENSMUSG00000051397
UniProt	P09758	Q8BGV3
RefSeq (mRNA)	NM_002353	NM_020047
RefSeq (protein)	NP_002344	NP_064431
Location (UCSC)	Chr 1: 58.58 – 58.58 Mb	Chr 6: 67.51 – 67.51 Mb
PubMed search
- Wikidata
View/Edit Human	View/Edit Mouse

Tumor-associated calcium signal transducer 2 (Trop-2) is a protein that is encoded by the TACSTD2 gene. The protein was identified via the monoclonal antibody GA733 (giving the name GA733-1). It was separately characterized as an epithelial cell-surface antigen (EGP-1) that was later recognized as a calcium signal transducer (TACSTD2/Trop-2).

This intronless gene is located at the short arm of chromosome 1 (1p32.1). It encodes a carcinoma-associated antigen that is closely related to epithelial cell adhesion molecule (EpCAM/TACSTD1). It transduces an intracellular calcium signal and acts as a cell surface receptor.

It is expressed in low levels in normal epithelia but is overexpressed in the membranes of many epithelial-derived cancers, including breast (especially triple-negative breast cancer), lung, gastric, colorectal, pancreatic, and ovarian, cancers. High expression of TACSTD2 in cancer drives proliferation and is associated with worse outcomes. Mutations of this gene result in gelatinous drop-like corneal dystrophy, an autosomal recessive disorder characterized by severe corneal amyloidosis leading to blindness.

== Tissue distribution ==
Trop-2 expression was originally described in trophoblasts (placenta) and fetal tissues (e.g., lung). Later, its expression was described in the normal stratified squamous epithelium of the skin, uterine cervix, esophagus, and tonsillar crypts.

== Function ==
Trop-2 plays a role in tumor progression by interacting with molecular signaling pathways traditionally associated with cancer development and progression. Aberrant overexpression of Trop-2 has been described in several solid cancers, such as colorectal, renal, lung, and breast cancers. Trop-2 expression has been described in some rare and aggressive malignancies, e.g., salivary duct, anaplastic thyroid, uterine/ovarian, and neuroendocrine prostate cancers. This overexpression is caused by deregulation at a transcriptional and posttranscriptional level.

== Clinical significance ==
=== Cancer ===
Trop-2 causes cancer cell growth, proliferation, invasion, migration, and survival of cancer cells. Trop-2 is associated with tumor aggressiveness and poor prognosis. Tumor cell proliferation is disturbed when Trop-2 is knocked down. Trop-2 is a possible prognostic biomarker to identify high-risk patients, as well as an attractive therapeutic target for late-stage disease.

=== Therapeutics ===
This antigen is the target of antibody-drug conjugates including sacituzumab govitecan, datopotamab deruxtecan (Dato-DXd), and sacituzumab tirumotecan. In May 2026, Merck announced that its Phase 3 sacituzumab tirumotecan TroFuse-005 trial met both primary endpoints (overall survival + progression-free survival) in patients with advanced or recurrent endometrial cancer who had progressed after platinum chemotherapy and immunotherapy. it has Breakthrough Therapy Designation for EGFR-mutated NSCLC.
