= OmniGuide =

Company in Cambridge, Massachusetts, USA

OmniGuide Inc.
- Company type: Private
- Industry: Medical devices
- Founded: 2000
- Headquarters: Cambridge, Massachusetts
- Key people: Scott Flora, President & CEO
- Website: omni-guide.com

OmniGuide, Inc. is a private medical-device company developing and commercializing minimally-invasive surgical tools. Founded in 2000, OmniGuide's manufacturing facilities and executive offices are located in Lexington, Massachusetts, USA. The company has manufacturing processes that are capable of manufacturing fibers with semiconductor-level tolerances and microscopic layers in a scalable manner.

== Technology ==
The technology is based on the revolutionary photonic bandgap fiber invented at MIT, published in Nature and Science, and subsequently licensed exclusively to the company. The first flexible fiber-optic surgical scalpel capable of delivering CO_{2} laser light has been developed using this technology. This allows the beam to pass into previously inaccessible areas of the body.
