= Exatecan =

Names
- Preferred IUPAC name (1S,9S)-1-Amino-9-ethyl-5-fluoro-9-hydroxy-4-methyl-1,2,3,9,12,15-hexahydro-10H,13H-benzo[de]pyrano[3′,4′:6,7]indolizino[1,2-b]quinoline-10,13-dione

Identifiers
CAS Number	171335-80-1
3D model (JSmol)	Interactive image; Interactive image
ChEMBL	ChEMBL1614650
ChemSpider	133194
PubChem CID	151115
UNII	OC71PP0F89
CompTox Dashboard (EPA)	DTXSID60169061
- InChI: InChI=1S/C24H22FN3O4/c1-3-24(31)14-6-18-21-12(8-28(18)22(29)13(14)9-32-23(24)30)19-16(26)5-4-11-10(2)15(25)7-17(27-21)20(11)19/h6-7,16,31H,3-5,8-9,26H2,1-2H3/t16-,24-/m0/s1 Key: ZVYVPGLRVWUPMP-FYSMJZIKSA-N; InChI=1/C24H22FN3O4/c1-3-24(31)14-6-18-21-12(8-28(18)22(29)13(14)9-32-23(24)30)19-16(26)5-4-11-10(2)15(25)7-17(27-21)20(11)19/h6-7,16,31H,3-5,8-9,26H2,1-2H3/t16-,24-/m0/s1 Key: ZVYVPGLRVWUPMP-FYSMJZIKBW
- SMILES: CCC1(C2=C(COC1=O)C(=O)N3CC4=C5C(CCC6=C5C(=CC(=C6C)F)N=C4C3=C2)N)O; Fc2c(c6c1c(c5c(nc1c2)C=3N(C(=O)\C4=C(/C=3)[C@](O)(C(=O)OC4)CC)C5)[C@@H](N)CC6)C

Properties
Chemical formula	C_{24}H_{22}FN_{3}O_{4}
Molar mass	435.455 g·mol^{−1}
- Except where otherwise noted, data are given for materials in their standard state (at 25 °C [77 °F], 100 kPa). verify (what is ?) Infobox references

Exatecan is a drug which is a structural analog of camptothecin with antineoplastic activity.

A derivative is used in Trastuzumab deruxtecan.

== Synthesis ==
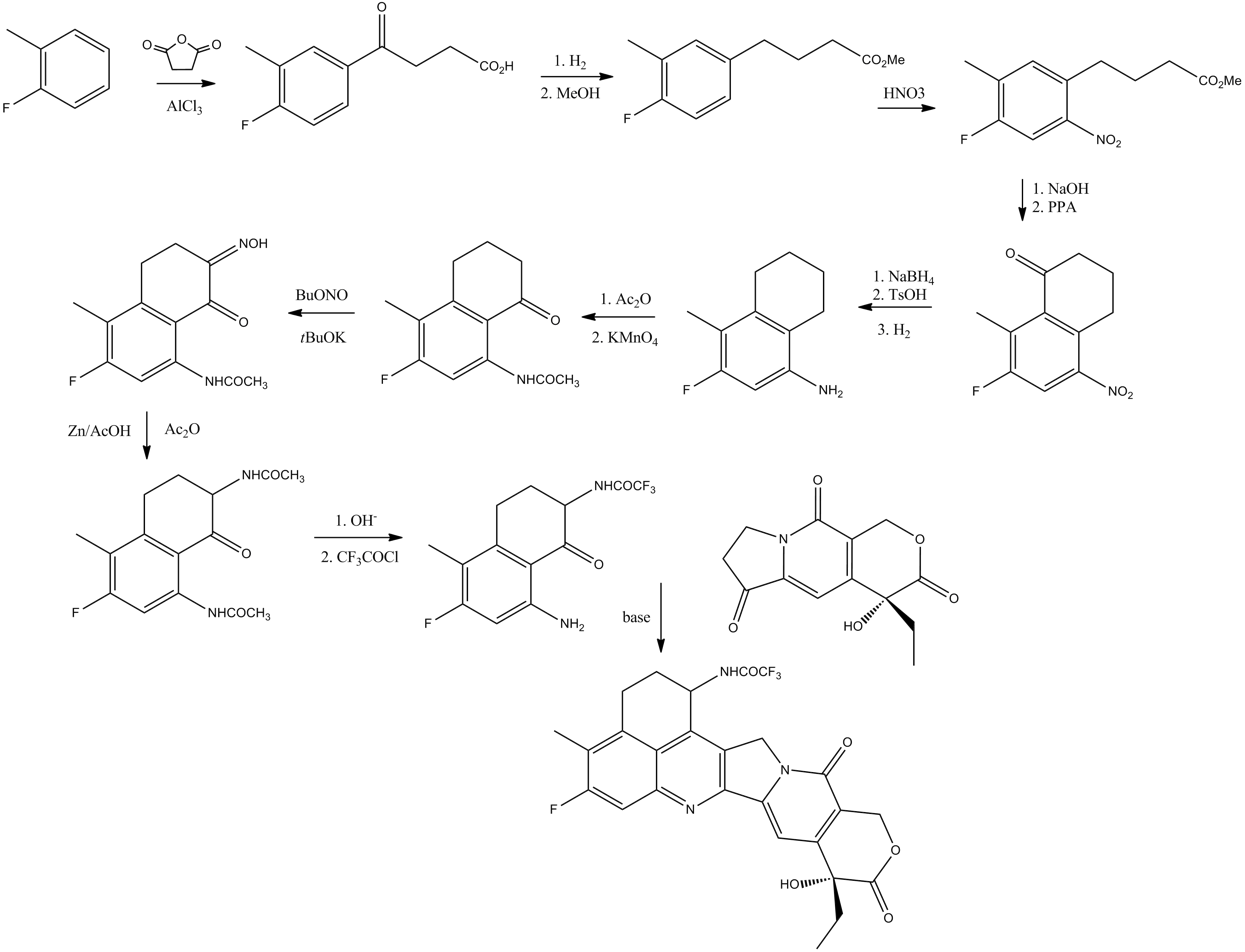
Exatecan synthesis
