= Plant sources of anti-cancer agents =

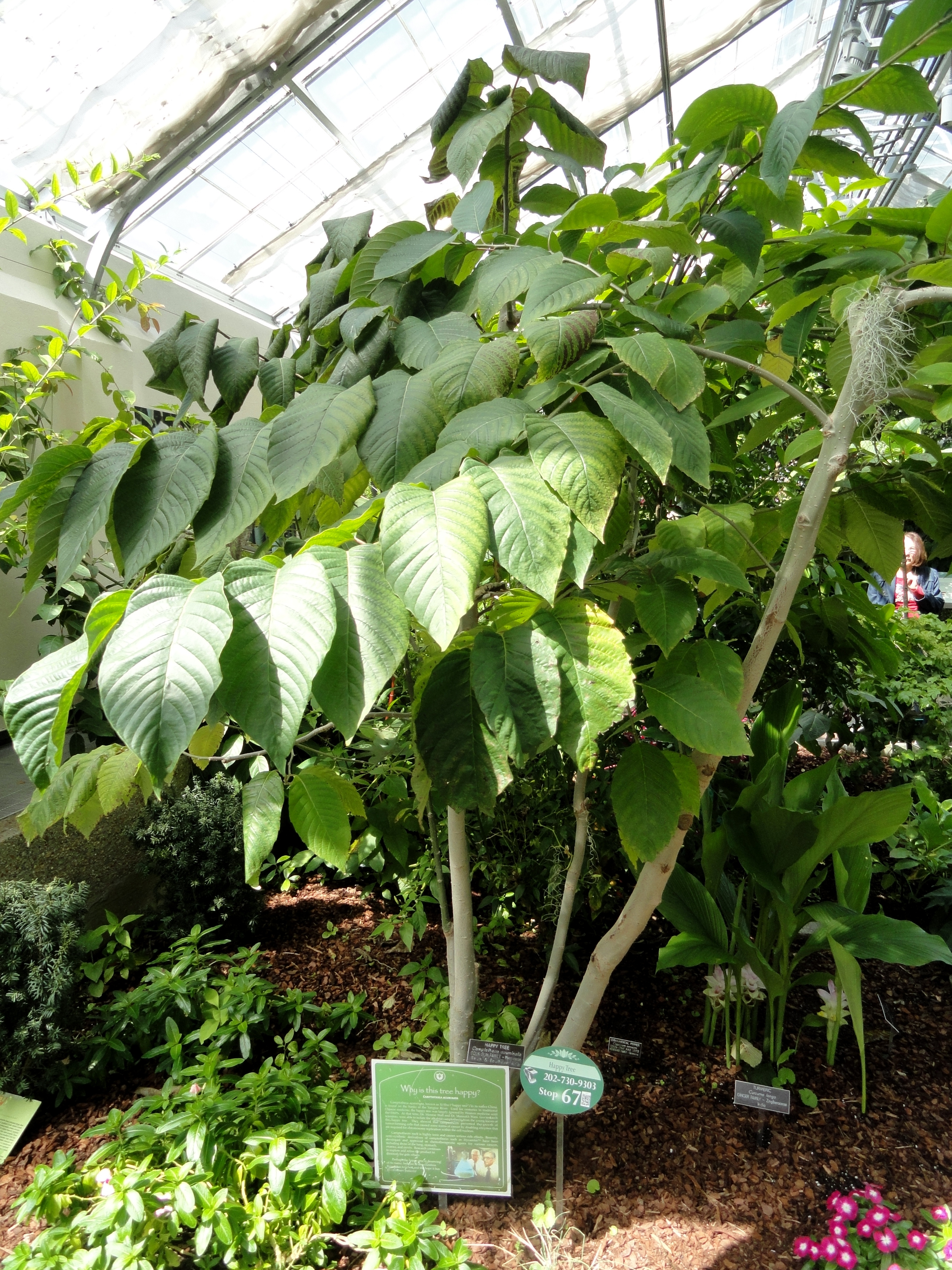
Extracts from Camptotheca (the "happy tree" or "cancer tree") were used to develop the chemotherapeutic drug Topotecan

Plant sources of anti-cancer agents are plants, the derivatives of which have been shown to be usable for the treatment or prevention of cancer in humans.

== Background ==
In the 1950s, scientists began systematically examining natural organisms as a source of useful anti-cancer substances. It has been argued that "the use of natural products has been the single most successful strategy in the discovery of novel medicines".

Plants need to defend themselves from attack by micro-organisms, in particular fungi, and they do this by producing anti-fungal chemicals that are toxic to fungi. Because fungal and human cells are similar at a biochemical level it is often the case that chemical compounds intended for plant defence have an inhibitory effect on human cells, including human cancer cells. Those plant chemicals that are selectively more toxic to cancer cells than normal cells have been discovered in screening programs and developed as chemotherapy drugs.

=== Research and development process ===
Some plants that indicate potential as an anticancer agent in laboratory-based in vitro research – for example, Typhonium flagelliforme, and Murraya koenigii are currently being studied. There can be many years between promising laboratory work and the availability of an effective anti-cancer drug: Monroe Eliot Wall discovered anti-cancer properties in Camptotheca in 1958, but it was not until 1996 – after further research and rounds of clinical trials – that topotecan, a synthetic derivative of a chemical in the plant, was approved for use by the US Food and Drug Administration.

== Plants ==
Camptotheca acuminata

The cancer treatment drug topotecan is a synthetic chemical compound similar in chemical structure to camptothecin which is found in extracts of Camptotheca (happy tree).

Catharanthus roseus

Vinca alkaloids were originally manufactured by extracting them from Catharanthus roseus (Madagascar Periwinkle).

Podophyllum spp.

Two chemotherapy drugs, etoposide and teniposide, are synthetic chemical compounds similar in chemical structure to the toxin podophyllotoxin which is found in Podophyllum peltatum (May Apple).

Taxus brevifolia

Chemicals extracted from clippings of Taxus brevifolia (Pacific yew) have been used as the basis for two chemotherapy drugs, docetaxel and paclitaxel.

Euphorbia peplus

Contains ingenol mebutate (Picato) which is used to treat skin cancer

Maytenus ovatus

Trastuzumab emtansine (Kadcyla) is an antibody conjugated to a synthetic derivative of the cytotoxic principle of the Ethiopian plant Maytenus ovatus. It used to treat breast cancer.

Mappia foetida

Some of the research has been showed that it has an effective anticancer property against breast cancer

== See also ==
- Herbal medicine
- Experimental cancer treatments
- Chemotherapy regimens
- National Comprehensive Cancer Network
- Alternative cancer treatments
