= Diflomotecan =

Chemical compound

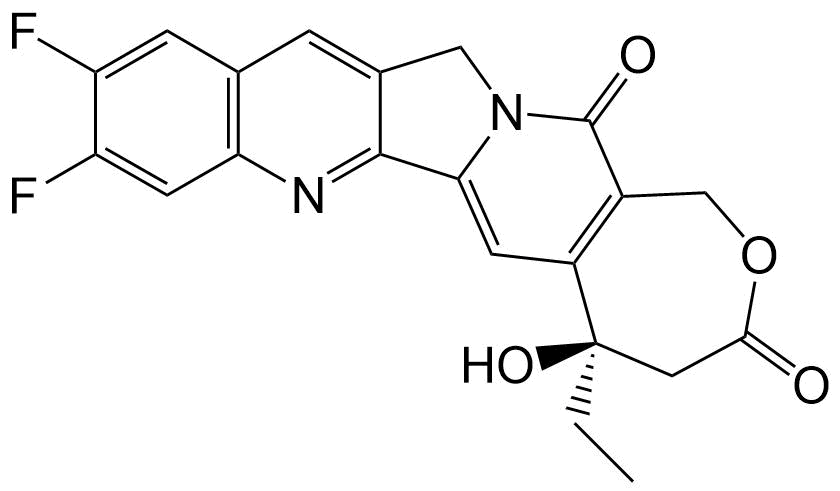

Clinical data
- Trade names: Diflomotecan

Identifiers
- IUPAC name: (R)-5-ethyl-9,10-difluoro-5-hydroxy-4,5-dihydrooxepino[3',4':6,7]indolizino[1,2-b]quinoline-3,15(1H,13H)-dione
- CAS Number: 220997-97-7
- PubChem CID: 219023
- ChemSpider: 189858
- UNII: QKT1LC4J1P
- ChEBI: CHEBI:144046
- ChEMBL: ChEMBL306280
- CompTox Dashboard (EPA): DTXSID201026358

Chemical and physical data
- Formula: C_{21}H_{16}F_{2}N_{2}O_{4}
- Molar mass: 398.366 g·mol^{−1}
- 3D model (JSmol): Interactive image
- SMILES: O=C1N2C(C3=NC(C=C(F)C(F)=C4)=C4C=C3C2)=CC([C@@](O)(CC)C5)=C1COC5=O
- InChI: InChI=1S/C21H16F2N2O4/c1-2-21(28)7-18(26)29-9-12-13(21)5-17-19-11(8-25(17)20(12)27)3-10-4-14(22)15(23)6-16(10)24-19/h3-6,28H,2,7-9H2,1H3/t21-/m1/s1; Key:LFQCJSBXBZRMTN-OAQYLSRUSA-N

Diflomotecan (also known as BN80905) is a chemotherapeutic agent that is a topoisomerase inhibitor (Top1). It varies from other camptothecin based Top1 inhibitors like topotecan in having a 7-membered E-ring. The oxepan-2-one ring in the homocamptothecin analogues is more stable in plasma compared to the 6-membered lactone in camptothecin. Diflomotecan was the first homocamptothecin to enter clinical trials and was previously in phase II for treating patients with sensitive small cell lung cancer (SCLC).

== Synthesis ==
The synthesis has been reported:

The cleavage of the tert-butyl ester in PC10834902 (1) with trifluoroacetic acid gives PC10831359 (2). This was resolved with quinidine to furnish (R)-3-(3-benzyloxymethyl-2-methoxy-pyridin-4-yl)-3-hydroxy-pentanoic acid, PC10807476 (3). Subsequent debenzylation of by transfer hydrogenation with ammonium formate and Pd/C gave PC10753497 (4). This was cyclized to the corresponding lactone employing DCC in hot THF to give PC10657503 (5). Dealkylation of the methyl ether group by means of Trimethylsilyl iodide, generated from Me3SiCl and NaI, produced the intermediate pyridinone [221054-70-2] (6).

Acylation of 3,4-difluoroaniline [3863-11-4] (7) with Ac2O and Et3N afforded N-(3,4-difluorophenyl)acetamide [458-11-7] (8). Subsequent condensation with Vilsmeier reagent produced 2-Chloro-6,7-difluoroquinoline-3-carbaldehyde [209909-13-7] (9). This was reduced with NaBH4 to give (2-Chloro-6,7-difluoroquinolin-3-yl)methanol, PC10513608 (10). Coupling with pyridinone [221054-70-2] (6) under Mitsunobu conditions yielded adduct PC10622734 (11). Finally, intramolecular Heck reaction in the presence of palladium diacetate and triphenylphosphine provided the desired pentacyclic compound.
