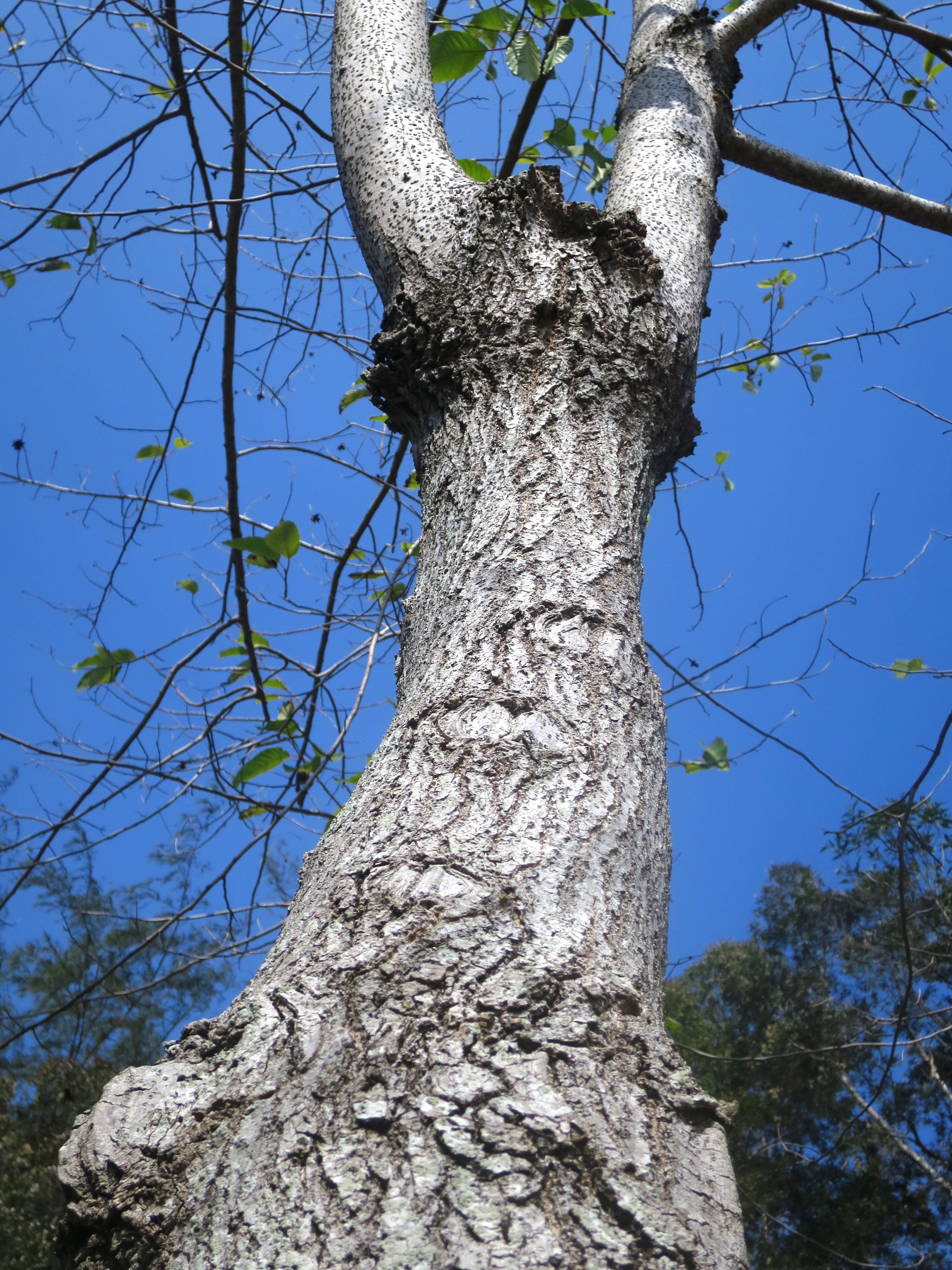
- Trunk of the tree

Scientific classification
- Kingdom: Plantae
- Clade: Tracheophytes
- Clade: Angiosperms
- Clade: Eudicots
- Clade: Asterids
- Order: Cornales
- Family: Nyssaceae
- Genus: Camptotheca
- Species: C. acuminata

Binomial name
- Camptotheca acuminata Decne. Bull. Soc. Bot. France 20: 157 (1873)

= Camptotheca acuminata =

Species of plant

Camptotheca acuminata is a species of tree in the genus Camptotheca that is native to north Vietnam and southern China. It is also cultivated in the southern United States.

A eudicot, it is a flowering deciduous tree with light gray bark. It can grow to a height of 20 metres (66 ft). Its large, papery leaves are somewhat oval in shape, usually 12 to 28 cm (5 to 10 in) long and 6 to 12 cm (2 to 5 in) wide. The flowers, which bloom from May through July, produce a gray-brown fruit with one seed in September.

== Uses ==
Camptotheca acuminata is a source of camptothecin chemicals, which have been tested for potential use as treatments for cancer and HIV. The modern chemotherapy drugs topotecan and irinotecan are derived from it, though now the molecules are produced in a lab environment rather than extracted from the leaves and bark of the tree. Because of this, it is sometimes called the "cancer tree".

In traditional Chinese medicine, the tree is called xǐ shù (Simplified Chinese:喜树) and was considered a relatively unimportant medicinal plant.

The tree is also grown for shade and ornamental value.

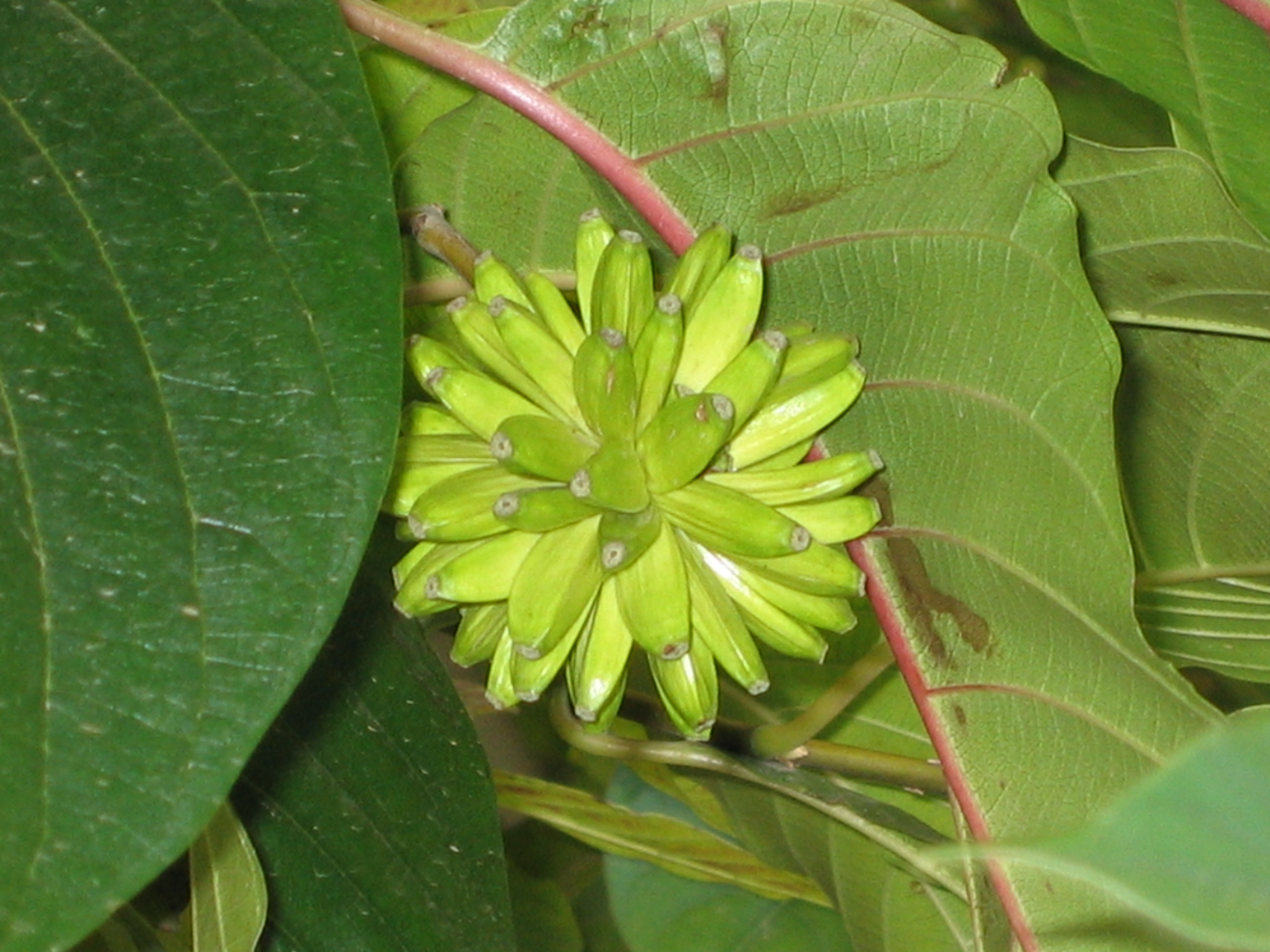

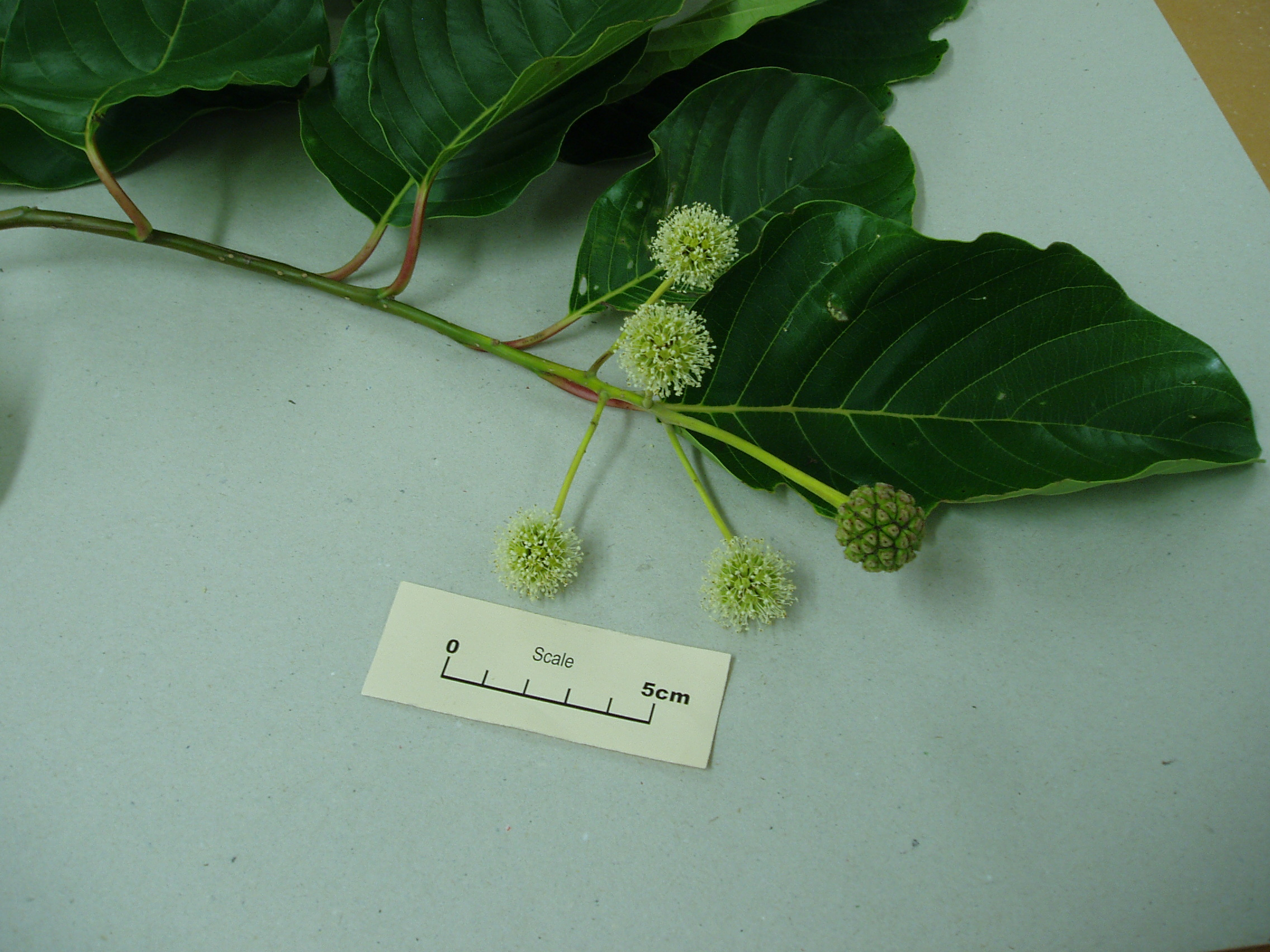

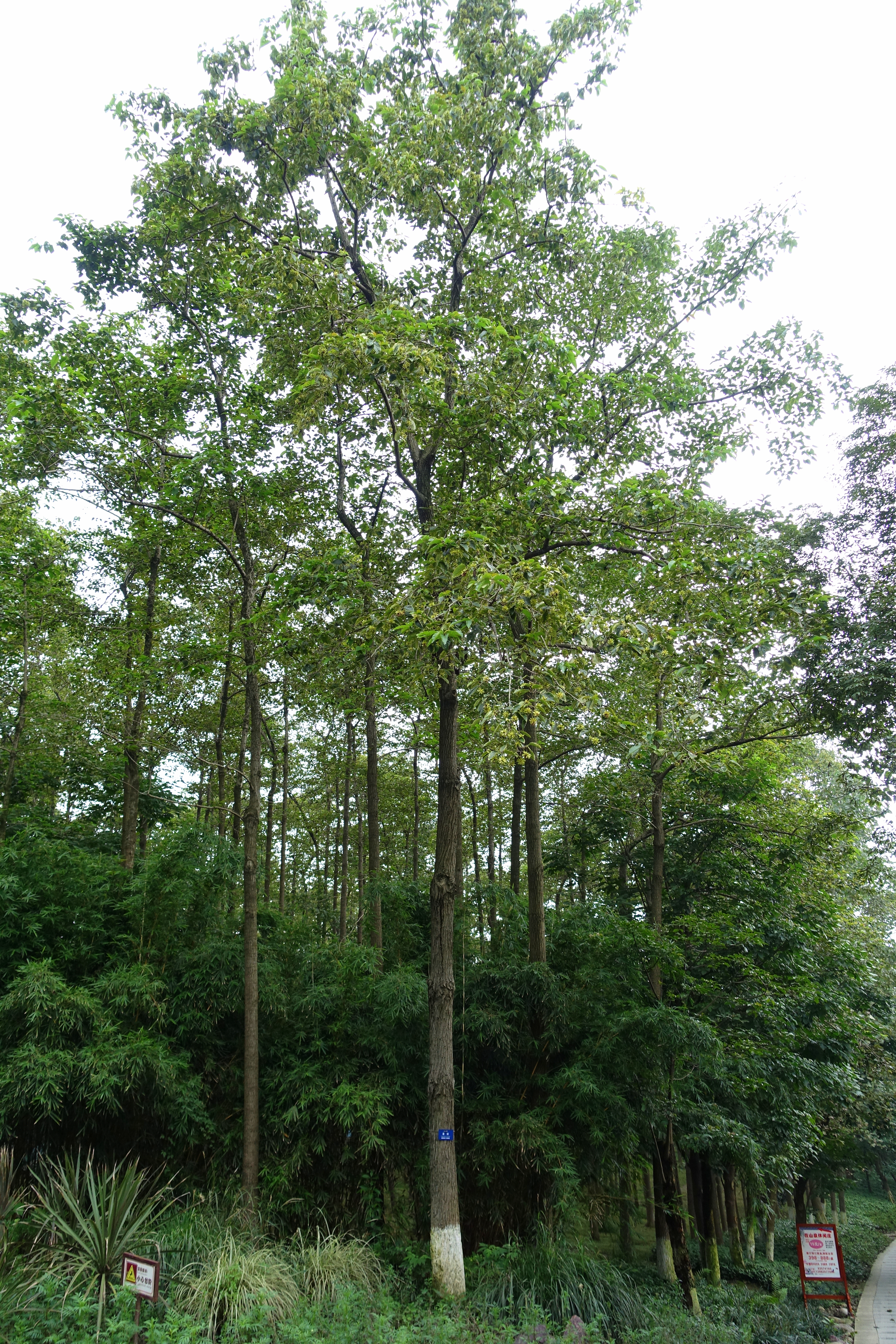

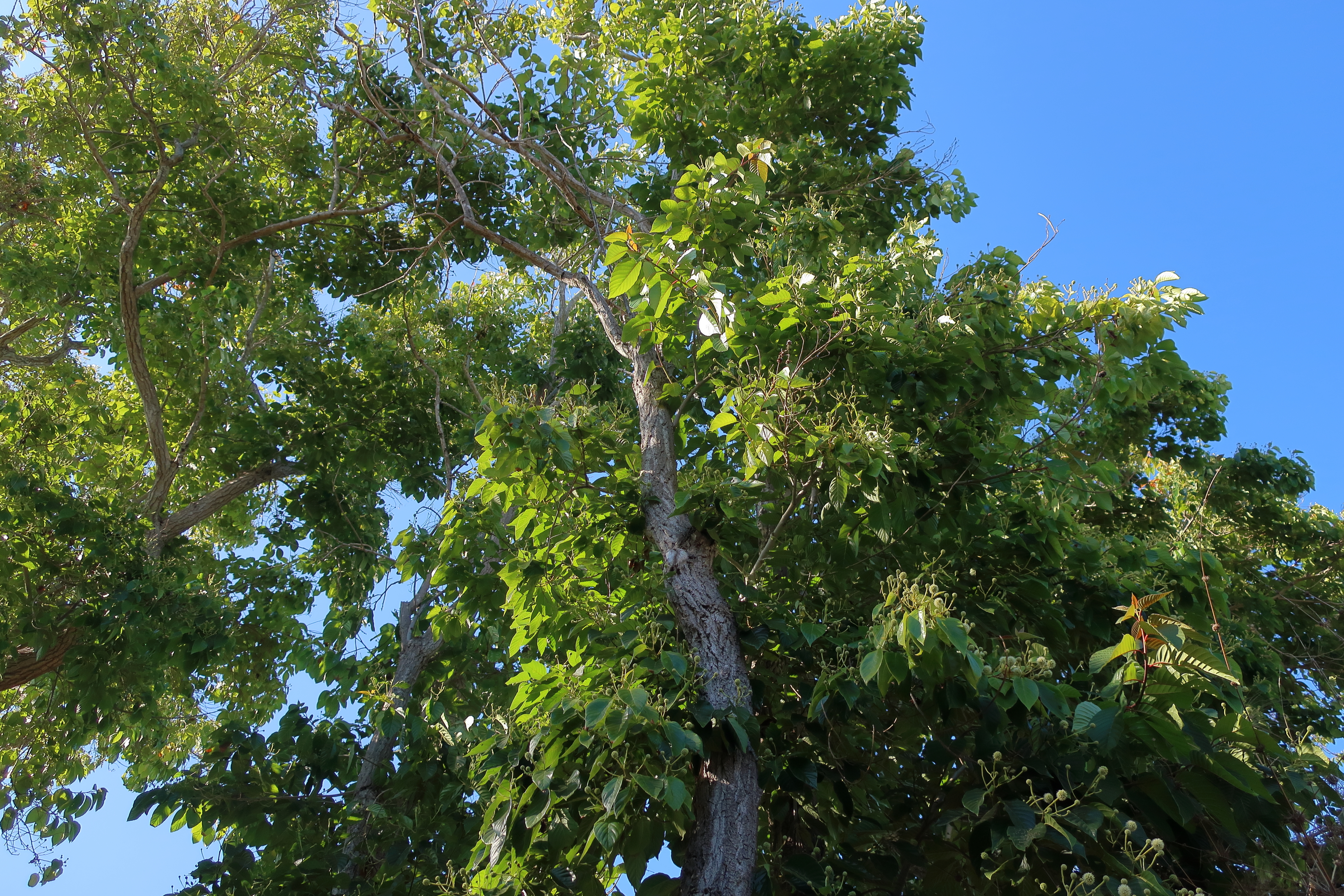
