= Mark E. Davis =

American chemical engineer and academic

- Born: October 14, 1955; Ellwood City, PA
- Education: University of Kentucky
- Known for: Molecular sieves, Drug delivery
- Spouse: Mary P. Davis
- Children: 3
- Awards: Princess of Asturias Award (2014); E. V. Murphree Award (2005)
- Scientific career
- Fields: Chemical Engineering
- Workplaces: California Institute of Technology; Virginia Tech
- Doctoral students: Suzie Pun

Mark E. Davis (born October 14, 1955) is the Warren and Katherine Schlinger Professor of Chemical Engineering at the California Institute of Technology. He is a member of the City of Hope National Medical Center. He earned his B.S., M.S., and Ph.D. in chemical engineering all from the University of Kentucky. His lab focuses on the synthesis of materials for catalysis and biocompatible materials for drug delivery.

Davis was elected as a member into the National Academy of Engineering in 1997, for pioneering work in the synthesis of new catalytic materials. He is the founder of Insert Therapeutics and Calando Pharmaceuticals.

== Research ==
He did his doctoral work with John Yamanis on reactions engineering with annular bed reactors. His academic career started as an assistant professor at Virginia Polytechnic Institute & State University in 1981 and rose until becoming the Charles O. Gordon Professor of Chemical engineering in 1990. During his time at Virginia Tech, he developed some of the earlier Zeolite molecular sieves and increasing the pore size. In 1991, he joined the faculty of the California Institute of Technology and served as the Executive Officer of the department from 1999 to 2004. In 2004 he joined the City of Hope National Medical Center, Comprehensive Cancer Center.

In 1995, his wife, Mary, was diagnosed with breast cancer and had to go through chemotherapy. Having seen the side effects of cancer treatment, he decided to do research on molecules that would prevent drug from leaking through healthy blood vessels but would stop at the tumor. His group conjugated cyclodextrin to the anti-cancer compound camptothecin to improve the bio-availability and exhibit efficacy in mouse tumor models. The compound, CRLX101 is now being tested in clinical trials. The cyclodextrin nanoparticles are also being used to encapsulate siRNA.

He was the recipient of the Alan T. Waterman Award in 1990. In 1997, he was elected to the National Academy of Engineering, in 2006, to the National Academy of Sciences, and in 2011, the National Academy of Medicine.

Davis is a member of the American Institute of Chemical Engineers, American Chemical Society, the Materials Research Society, and the American Society for Gene Therapy professional organizations, and of Phi Eta Sigma, Omega Chi Epsilon and Tau Beta Pi engineering honor societies. He was inducted into the College of Engineering Hall of Distinction in 1999.

== Personal ==
Davis was born in Ellwood City, Pennsylvania, the son of schoolteachers. Mark Davis is an accomplished athlete and was on a full scholarship in track and field at the University of Kentucky. He is the 400-Meter World Champion for the 55–59 division. He was also part of the USA 4x100 and 4x400 meter teams.

Davis met his wife Mary, who received her undergraduate degree and a master's of business administration from Virginia Tech, while he was a professor at the same school. She was an accomplished flautist before being diagnosed with breast cancer. The couple has three children.
