= Suzie Pun =

American bioengineer

- Education: Stanford University California Institute of Technology
- Known for: Targeted drug delivery
- Scientific career
- Fields: Chemical Engineering, bioengineering
- Doctoral advisor: Mark E. Davis

Suzie Hwang Pun is an American bioengineer, the Washington Research Foundation Professor of Bioengineering at the University of Washington and the director of the university's Molecular Engineering & Sciences Institute. Her research focuses on the use of polymers for targeted drug delivery.

== Education and career ==
Pun majored in chemical engineering at Stanford University, graduating in 1996. She continued her studies in chemical engineering at the California Institute of Technology, receiving a master's degree there in 1998 and completing her Ph.D. in 2000. Her doctoral supervisor was Mark E. Davis.

After working in industry as a senior scientist at Insert Therapeutics from 2000 to 2003, she returned to academia in 2003 as an assistant professor of bioengineering at the University of Washington. She was promoted to associate professor in 2009, and in 2014 she was promoted to full professor and given an endowed chair as Robert F. Rushmer Professor of Bioengineering. She became Washington Research Foundation Professor in 2020, and was named as director of the Molecular Engineering & Sciences Institute in 2022.

== Recognition ==
Pun was a 2005 recipient of the National Science Foundation (NSF) Presidential Early Career Award for Scientists and Engineers. She was elected to the American Institute for Medical and Biological Engineering College of Fellows in 2015, "for outstanding contributions to the development of new biomaterials and their use in drug and gene delivery to cells". She was also elected to the National Academy of Inventors in 2015, and to the Washington State Academy of Sciences in 2018.
