= Jianjun Cheng =

Chinese material scientist

- Born: China

Academic background
- Education: BSc, Chemistry, 1993, Nankai University; MS, Chemistry, 1996, Southern Illinois University Carbondale; PhD, Materials Science, 2001, University of California, Santa Barbara

Jianjun Cheng
- Traditional Chinese: 程建軍
- Simplified Chinese: 程建军
Transcriptions
Standard Mandarin
- Hanyu Pinyin: Chéng Jiànjūn
- Wade–Giles: Ch'êng Chien-chün

Jianjun Cheng is a Chinese-American material scientist.

== Early life and education ==
Cheng completed his Bachelor of Science degree at Nankai University in 1993 before moving to North America for his graduate studies. In 1996, he completed his master's degree at Southern Illinois University Carbondale and later earned his PhD in materials science at the University of California, Santa Barbara.

== Career ==
Following his PhD, Cheng became a senior scientist at Insert Therapeutics from 2001 to 2004 before accepting a postdoctoral fellowship at the Massachusetts Institute of Technology. He remained there for one year before joining the faculty at the University of Illinois Urbana-Champaign (U of I) in 2005. As an assistant professor, Cheng earned a National Science Foundation CAREER Award for his project Development of Conjugated Polymer-Drug Nanoparticulate Delivery Vehicles in 2008. Following this, he co-developed polymer production to synthesize peptidic brushlike polymers and make it easier to create highly uniform polymers. Throughout his early tenure at U of I, Cheng helped pioneer the use of aptamers as targeting molecules for drug delivery. As a result, he also co-developed a reversible method for delivering cancer drugs to tumor cells.

In 2014, Cheng and his graduate student Hanze Ying co-established a startup titled Hindered Polyurea Technology (HPT). He also co-authored a study in the Proceedings of the National Academy of Sciences of the United States of America, where he evaluated the size-dependent biological profiles of three monodisperse drug-silica nanoconjugates at 20, 50 and 200 nm. A few months later, Cheng co-developed inexpensive hydrolyzable polymer to reverse the characteristics of polyurea. As a result of his research accomplishments, Cheng was named an inaugural Faculty Entrepreneurial Fellow at the Grainger College of Engineering in 2015. He was also elected a Fellow of the American Institute for Medical and Biological Engineering (AIMBE) for his " outstanding contribution to the development of polymeric biomaterials and translational nanomedicine."

As the Hans Thurnauer Professor of Materials Science and Engineering, Cheng continued to explore ways to deliver therapeutic drugs to specific cells and tissues in the body. His efforts for "the discovery, development and clinical translation of nanomedicines and biomaterials, especially for targeted cancer therapies" were recognized in 2016 by the American Association for the Advancement of Science. In 2020, he was elected to the National Academy of Inventors. In January 2021, Cheng was appointed the editor-in-chief for Biomaterials Science after serving as an Associate Editor for the journal for over seven years. Following this, Cheng left U of I to become the Dean of School of Engineering and Chair of Materials Science and Engineering at Westlake University.

In August 2021, Cheng left the University of Illinois at Urbana–Champaign to join the Westlake University School of Engineering.
