= MK-2870 =

Antibody-drug conjugate

MK-2870 or SKB264 is an experimental antibody–drug conjugate. The antibody component is directed against "the trophoblast cell-surface antigen 2 (TROP2), which is overexpressed in many types of solid tumors, coupled to moderate cytotoxic belotecan-derivative through a novel linker which was designed to balance the extracellular stability and intracellular rupture". The drug is developed as a partnership between Merck and the Chinese company Kelun-Biotech.
