= Lurtotecan =

Names
- Preferred IUPAC name (8S)-8-Ethyl-8-hydroxy-15-[(4-methylpiperazin-1-yl)methyl]-2,3-dihydro-11H-[1,4]dioxino[2,3-g]pyrano[3′,4′:6,7]indolizino[1,2-b]quinoline-9,12(8H,14H)-dione

Identifiers
CAS Number	149882-10-0
3D model (JSmol)	Interactive image
ChEMBL	ChEMBL305666
ChemSpider	54919
PubChem CID	60956
UNII	4J1L80T08I
CompTox Dashboard (EPA)	DTXSID30164422
- InChI: InChI=1S/C28H30N4O6/c1-3-28(35)20-11-22-25-18(14-32(22)26(33)19(20)15-38-27(28)34)17(13-31-6-4-30(2)5-7-31)16-10-23-24(12-21(16)29-25)37-9-8-36-23/h10-12,35H,3-9,13-15H2,1-2H3/t28-/m0/s1 Key: RVFGKBWWUQOIOU-NDEPHWFRSA-N; InChI=1/C28H30N4O6/c1-3-28(35)20-11-22-25-18(14-32(22)26(33)19(20)15-38-27(28)34)17(13-31-6-4-30(2)5-7-31)16-10-23-24(12-21(16)29-25)37-9-8-36-23/h10-12,35H,3-9,13-15H2,1-2H3/t28-/m0/s1 Key: RVFGKBWWUQOIOU-NDEPHWFRBI
- SMILES: O=C2OCC=1C(=O)N6/C(=C\C=1[C@@]2(O)CC)c5nc4cc3OCCOc3cc4c(c5C6)CN7CCN(C)CC7

Properties
Chemical formula	C_{28}H_{30}N_{4}O_{6}
Molar mass	518.561 g/mol
- Except where otherwise noted, data are given for materials in their standard state (at 25 °C [77 °F], 100 kPa). verify (what is ?) Infobox references

Lurtotecan is a semi-synthetic analog of camptothecin with antineoplastic activity. Liposomal lurtotecan was in clinical trials as a treatment for topotecan-resistant ovarian cancer, but was discontinued.

== Synthesis ==
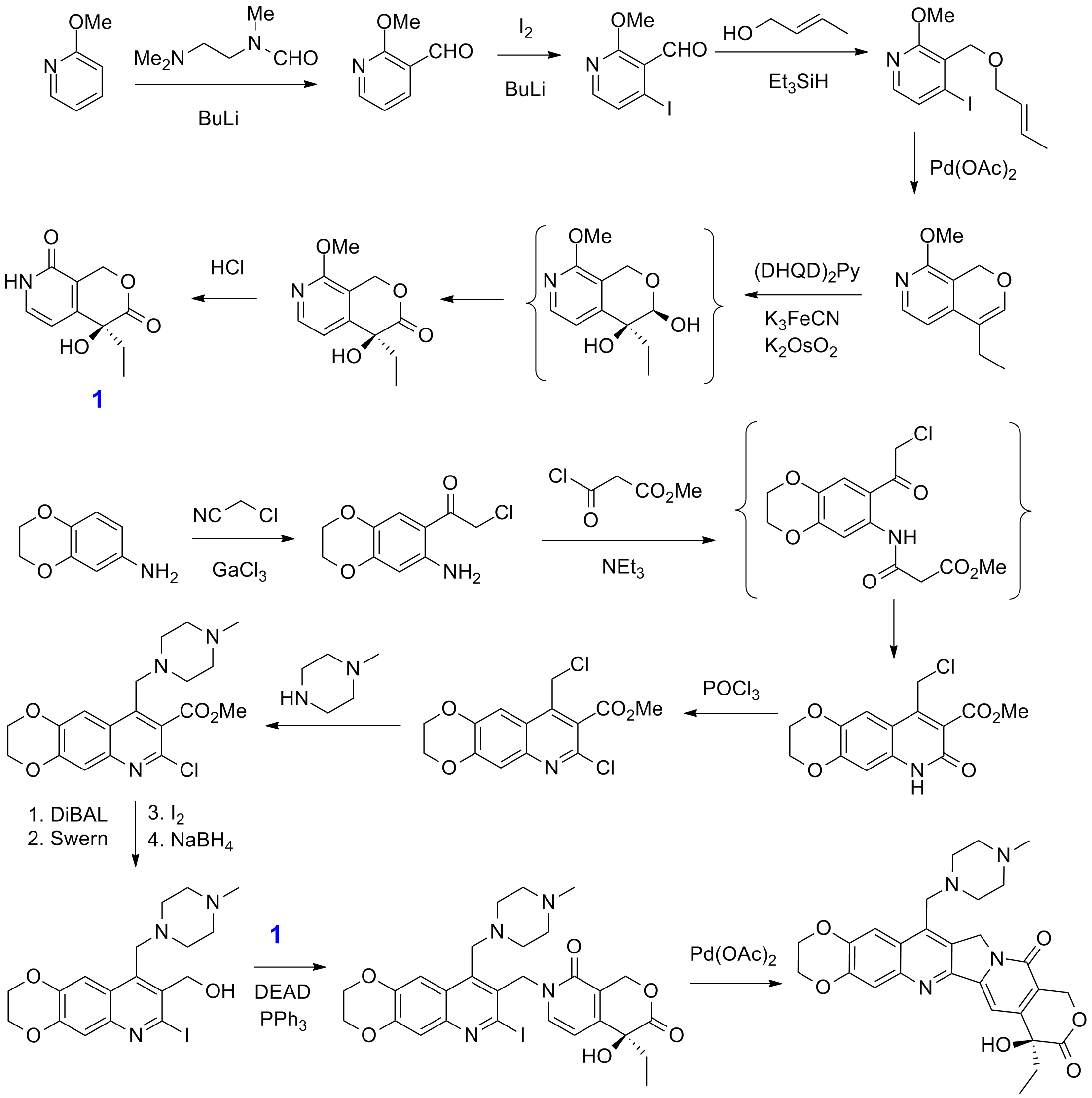
Lurtotecan synthesis

- Heck reaction
- Mitsunobu reaction
- Potassium osmate
- Sharpless asymmetric dihydroxylation
- Swern oxidation
