= Belotecan =

Chemical compound

Clinical data
- ATC code: L01CE04 (WHO)

Identifiers
- IUPAC name: (4S)-4-Ethyl-4-hydroxy-11-[2-(isopropylamino)ethyl]-1H-pyrano[3',4':6,7]indolizino[1,2-b]quinoline-3,14(4H,12H)-dione
- CAS Number: 256411-32-2
- PubChem CID: 6456014
- DrugBank: DB12459
- ChemSpider: 4958253
- UNII: 27Z82M2G1N
- KEGG: D03225
- ChEMBL: ChEMBL2107315
- CompTox Dashboard (EPA): DTXSID60180332

Chemical and physical data
- Formula: C_{25}H_{27}N_{3}O_{4}
- Molar mass: 433.508 g·mol^{−1}
- 3D model (JSmol): Interactive image
- SMILES: O=C\1N4\C(=C/C2=C/1COC(=O)[C@]2(O)CC)c3nc5c(c(c3C4)CCNC(C)C)cccc5
- InChI: InChI=1S/C25H27N3O4/c1-4-25(31)19-11-21-22-17(12-28(21)23(29)18(19)13-32-24(25)30)15(9-10-26-14(2)3)16-7-5-6-8-20(16)27-22/h5-8,11,14,26,31H,4,9-10,12-13H2,1-3H3/t25-/m0/s1; Key:LNHWXBUNXOXMRL-VWLOTQADSA-N

Belotecan is a drug used in chemotherapy. It is a semi-synthetic camptothecin analogue indicated for small-cell lung cancer and ovarian cancer, approved in South Korea under the trade name Camtobell, presented in 2 mg vials for injection. The drug has been marketed by Chong Kun Dang Pharmaceuticals since 2003.

== Mechanism of action ==
Belotecan blocks topoisomerase I with a pIC_{50} of 6.56, stabilizing the cleavable complex of topoisomerase I-DNA, which inhibits the religation of single-stranded DNA breaks generated by topoisomerase I; lethal double-stranded DNA breaks occur when the topoisomerase I-DNA complex is encountered by the DNA replication machinery, DNA replication is disrupted, and the tumor cell undergoes apoptosis. Topoisomerase I is an enzyme that mediates reversible single-strand breaks in DNA during DNA replication.
