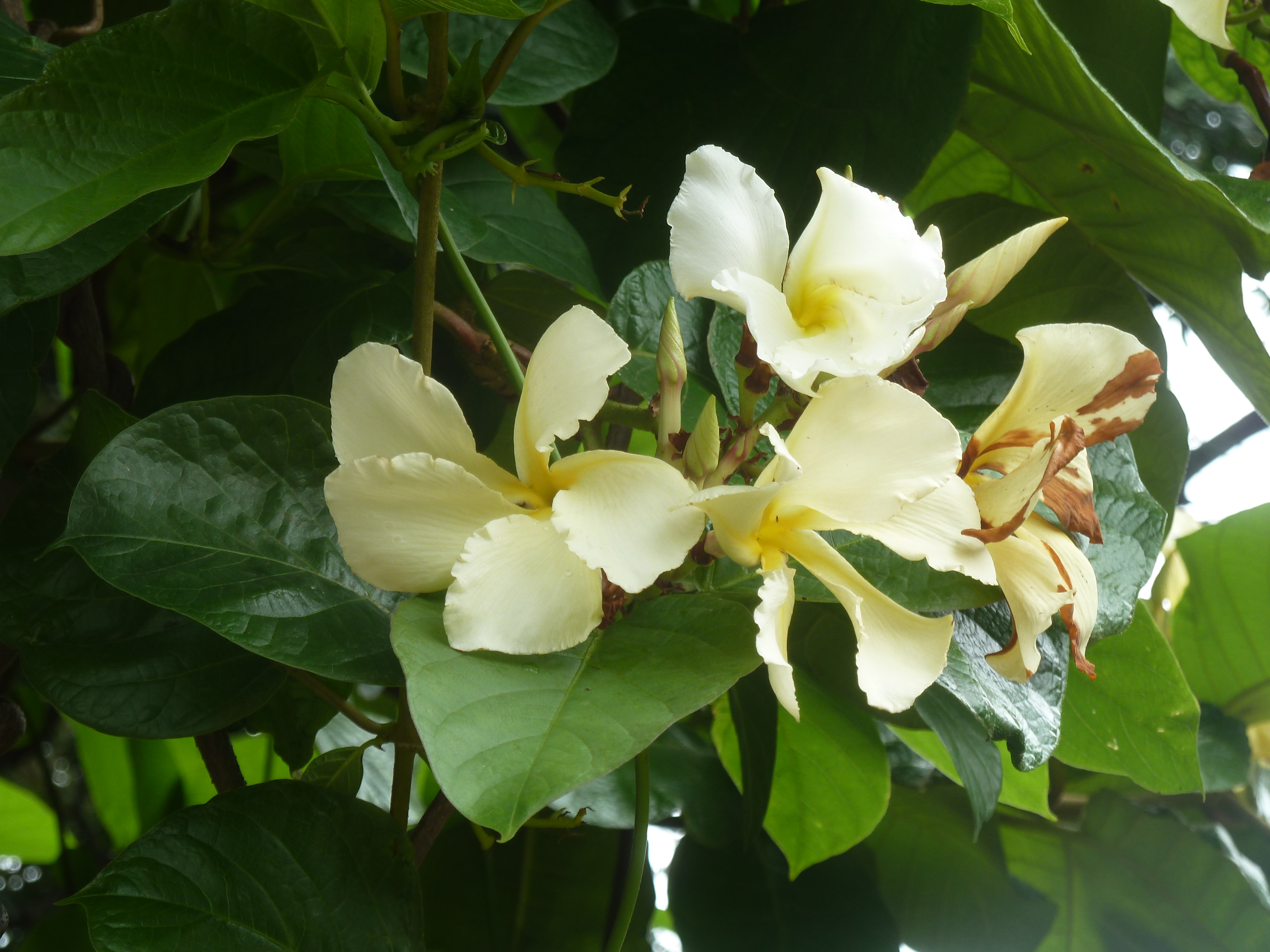

Scientific classification
- Kingdom: Plantae
- Clade: Tracheophytes
- Clade: Angiosperms
- Clade: Eudicots
- Clade: Asterids
- Order: Gentianales
- Family: Apocynaceae
- Genus: Chonemorpha
- Species: C. fragrans

Binomial name
- Chonemorpha fragrans (Moon) Alston

Synonyms
- 25 synonyms: Chonemorpha rheedei Ridl.; Echites fragrans Moon; Beluttakaka grandieriana Pierre; Beluttakaka griffithii (Hook.f.) Kuntze; Beluttakaka macrophylla (G.Don) Kuntze; Cercocoma macrantha Teijsm. & Binn.; Chonemorpha blancoi Merr.; Chonemorpha elliptica Merr. & Rolfe; Chonemorpha grandieriana Pierre ex Spire; Chonemorpha grandiflora G.Don; Chonemorpha griffithii Hook.f.; Chonemorpha macrantha Pit.; Chonemorpha macrophylla G.Don; Chonemorpha macrophylla var. grandis A.DC.; Chonemorpha penangensis Ridl.; Chonemorpha valvata Chatterjee; Chonemorpha yersinii Vernet; Echites grandiflorus Roth; Echites grandis Wall.; Echites latifolius Buch.-Ham. ex Wall.; Echites macranthus Spreng.; Echites macrophyllus Roxb.; Epichysianthus macrophyllus (G.Don) Voigt; Rhynchodia macrantha Pharm. ex Wehmer; Tabernaemontana elliptica Blanco

= Chonemorpha fragrans =

Species of flowering plant

Chonemorpha fragrans, the frangipani vine or climbing frangipani, is a plant species in the genus Chonemorpha. It is a vigorous, generally evergreen, climbing shrub producing stems 30 m (98 ft) or more long that can climb to the tops of the tallest trees in the forests of Southeast Asia. It has scented, white flowers and large shiny leaves. It is native to China, India (the Himalayas), Indonesia, Malaysia, Myanmar, Sri Lanka and Thailand. It is very commonly used in Ayurveda (an Indian traditional medicine) and it is also cultivated mostly worldwide in frost-free places.

== Description ==
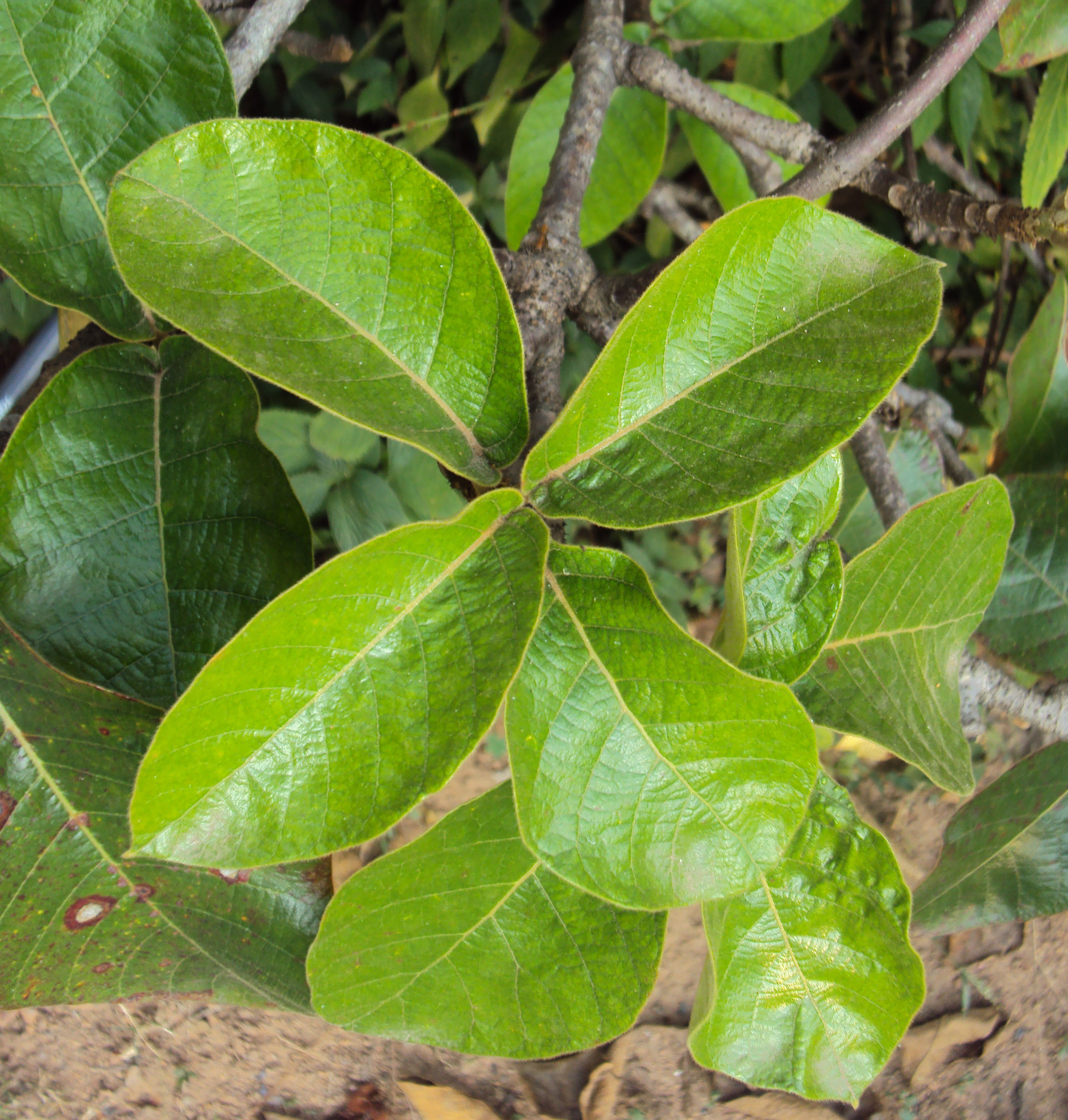
Franginpani vine leaves

Chonemorpha fragrans is a vigorous climber, reaching up to 30 m (98 ft). It can also grow or spread to about 7 m (23 ft) wide, depending on the support. It has a rusty brown, or grey barked stem which is numerously lenticelled. The bark can produce fibre of good quality.

It is evergreen in most tropical climates. Elsewhere, in the spring, the fresh new leaves are bright green with a bronze hue. The mature leaves are large, deep green, shiny, and hirsute (hairy), especially underneath. They are broadly ovate, orbicular, or elliptic in shape. They have a 2cm long petiole, and they are 15–45 cm (6–18 in) wide and 13–45 cm (5–18 in) long, with 10–12 pairs of lateral, prominent veins.

It has terminal (end of stem), clusters of blooms, appearing from spring to autumn, from May to July, or between April and October. They are highly fragrant, and the scent is thought to be very similar to that of the Singapore White plumeria.

They have tubular sepals, which are 1 cm long, a white corolla which is 8–10 cm (3–4 in) long. It has a hairy throat, which is yellow.

After it has bloomed, between July and September, it produces a lanceolate or oblong seedcase. Inside the seed case, are flat seeds, shortly beaked with long white silky coma.

All parts of the plant produce a milk-like substance when damaged.

=== Biochemistry ===
Chonemorpha fragrans contains alkaloids including camptothecin (CPT), chonemorphine, and funtumafrine. Camptothecin is a monoterpene indole alkaloid and several synthetic drugs which are analogs of camptothecin are used in chemotherapy for cancer of various types. Chonemorphine is a steroidal alkaloid which has been studied in Wistar rats for its possible use for intestinal infections.

Chonemorpha fragrans has two sets of chromosomes with a count of 2n=20.

== Taxonomy ==
The Latin name is pronounced as Chonemorpha (koh-nee-MORF-a) fragrans (FRAY-granz).

It is commonly known as 'Frangipani Vine', or 'Climbing Frangipani' and rarely in India as 'Funnel-Flower Vine'.

The flowers are very similar to the Frangipani in scent and shape, hence the common names.

Due to its wide range it has various local names such as; 'Gardhedaro' in hindi, 'Manjinaru', or 'Chandra hoovina balli' in Kannada, 'Perunkurumpa', 'Paal valli', or akar gerip merah in Malayalam, 'Murva' or 'morala' in Sanskrit, 'velutha kaaka kodi' in Tamil and 'Chaga' in Telugu.

Also within parts of China (such as Guangxi, Yunnan and Tibet) and the Indian Subcontinent and Indochina, its name in Khmer is /vɔə crẹj cruəj/ វល្លិជ្រៃជ្រួយ or /vɔə ʔɑŋkɑt krəhɑːm/ វល្លិអង្កត់ក្រហម.),

It is written as 大叶鹿角藤 in Chinese script and known as da ye lu jiao teng in Pidgin in China.

It was first originally described and published by botanist Alexander Moon as Echites fragrans Moon, in his 'Catalogue of the indigenous and exotic Plants growing in Ceylon' (Cat. Pl. Ceylon.) Vol.20 in 1824. The species was then renamed and it was then re-published by English botanist Arthur Hugh Garfit Alston (1902–1958) in Annals of the Royal Botanic Gardens (Ann. Roy. Bot. Gard.) Vol.11 on page 203 in 1929.

It was verified by United States Department of Agriculture and the Agricultural Research Service on 20 January 2012.

It is an RHS Accepted name and was last-listed in the RHS Plant Finder in 2005.

== Distribution and habitat ==
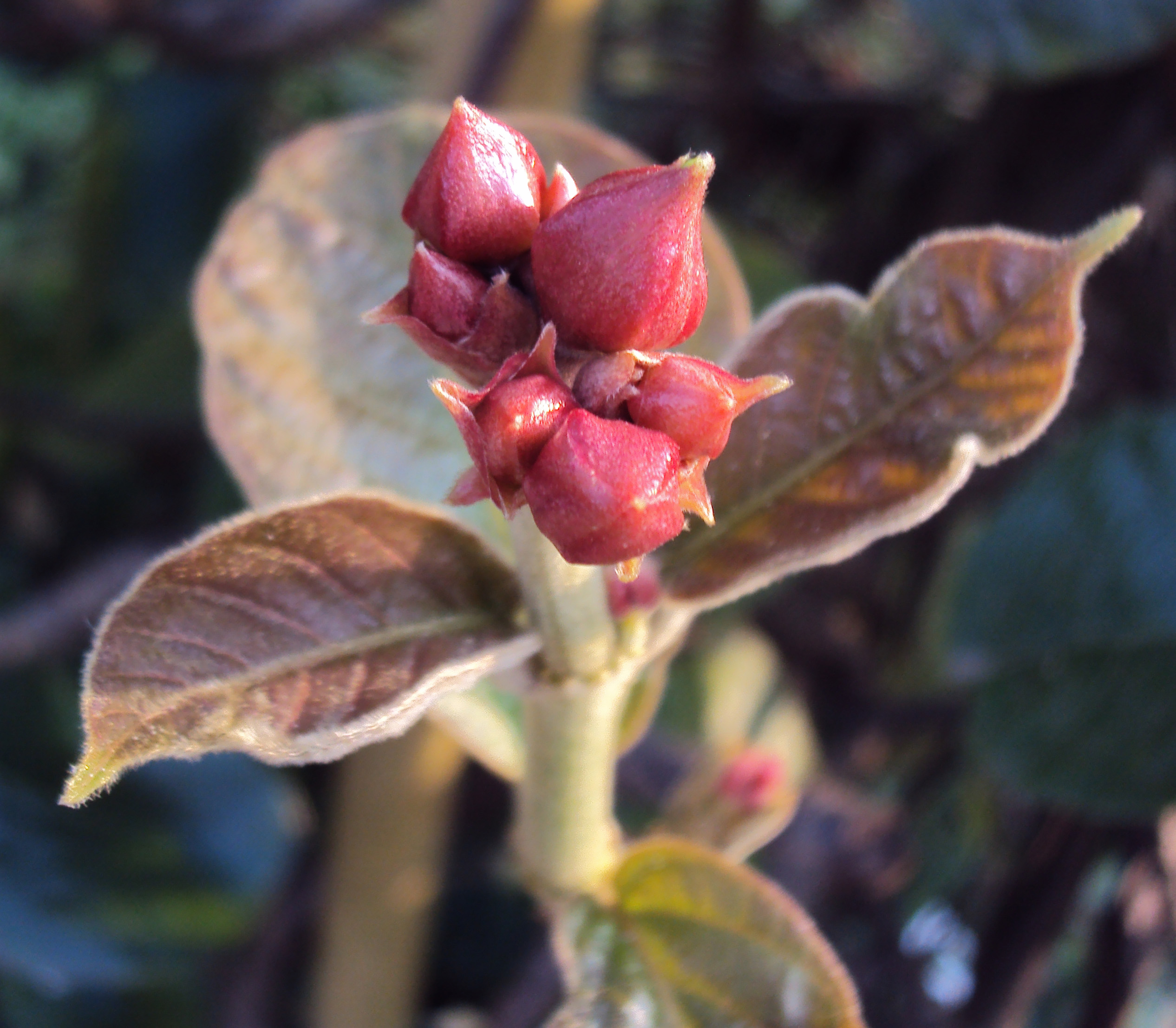
Franginpani vine flower buds

It is native to temperate Asia and Tropical and subtropical Asia.

=== Range ===
It is native to a large area of Asia, from the Himalayas to Java.

In temperate Asia, it is found within China (within the provinces of Yunnan Sheng and Guangxi).

Within tropical Asia, it is found in the countries of Bangladesh, Bhutan, India, (including Nicobar Islands,) Nepal, Sri Lanka, Myanmar, Thailand, Brunei, East Timor, Indonesia, (including the islands of Sulawesi, Lesser Sunda Islands and Sumatra) Malaysia and the Philippines.

It is cultivated also in Fujian and Guangdong in China.

=== Habitat ===
It prefers to grow in moist deciduous to semi-evergreen forests. or evergreen forests, where it often clings to the trees. In dense mountain forests it can reach altitudes of 400–1,800 m (1,300–5,900 ft) above sea level.

== Cultivation ==
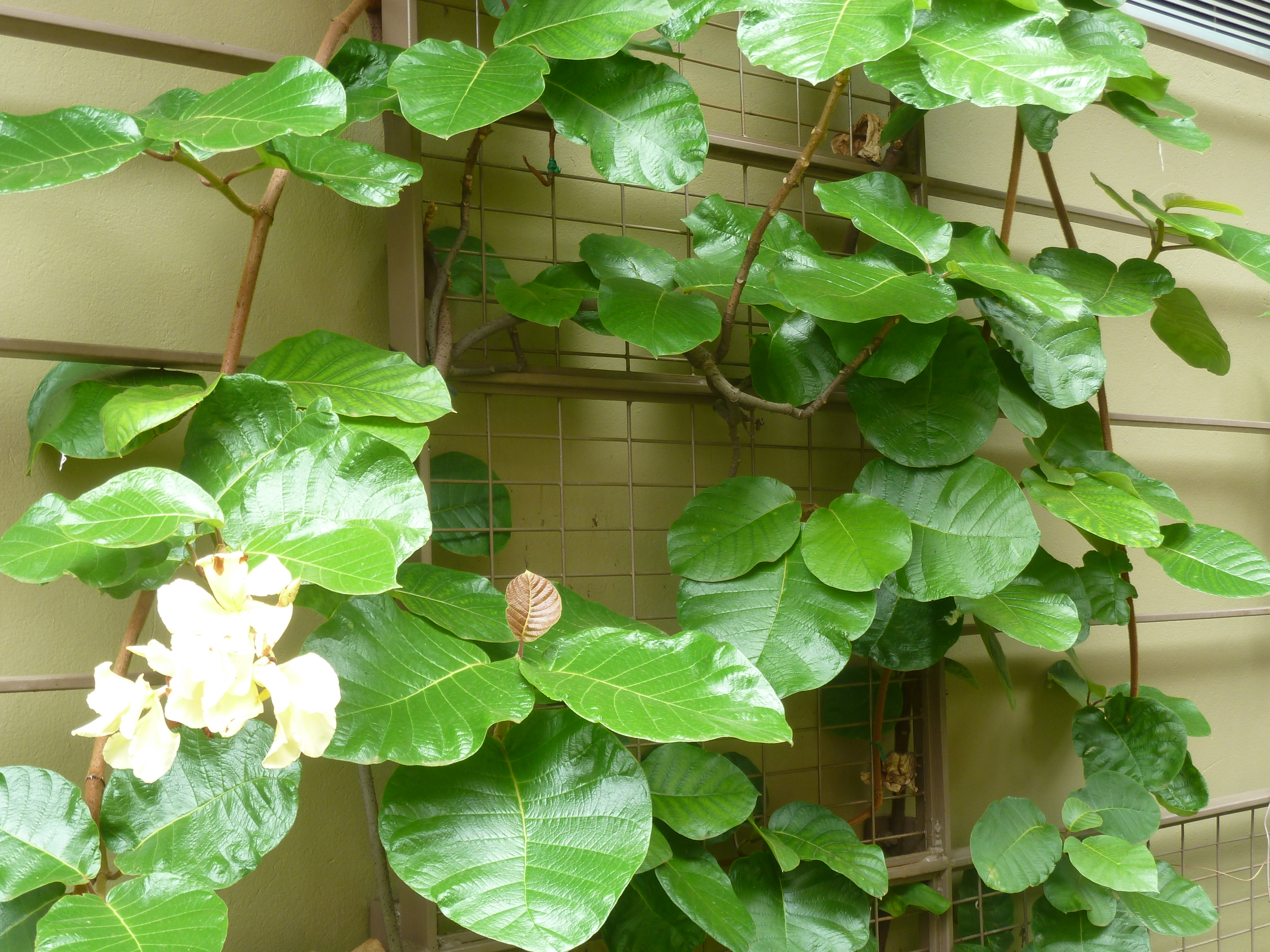
Chonemorpha fragrans growing on a trellis in Manie van der Schijff Botanical Garden. South Africa

As the plant is semi-deciduous in subtropical areas, it can tolerate some colder temperatures (about 30 - 40°F,) but will then be fully dormant during the winter months, but it prefers a frost-free warm position. It may lose leaves if temperature drops below 45°F. In USA, it is hardy to between USDA Zone 9b: to -3.8 °C (25 °F) and USDA Zone 11: above 4.5 °C (40 °F).

It prefers to grow in well-drained, acid soils, which are rich and free draining. Loamy soil is the ideal soil type as it does not like poor soils.

It needs ample moisture during the summer months, but not constantly moist.

It can grown in full or partial sun. but is best in full sun, for better flowering.

Within the garden setting, it is best grown on large structures (such as pergolas, trellises or columns). Alternatively it can naturally ramble over tall trees, as they do not cling to walls.

It is used to create a 'tropical' feel within the garden.

It is a disease free, and are not affected by frangipani rust.

They can be grown in pots but prefer to be directly into the ground.

During the winter, is the preferred time to prune to restrict the climbing growth to a manageable size.

=== Propagation ===
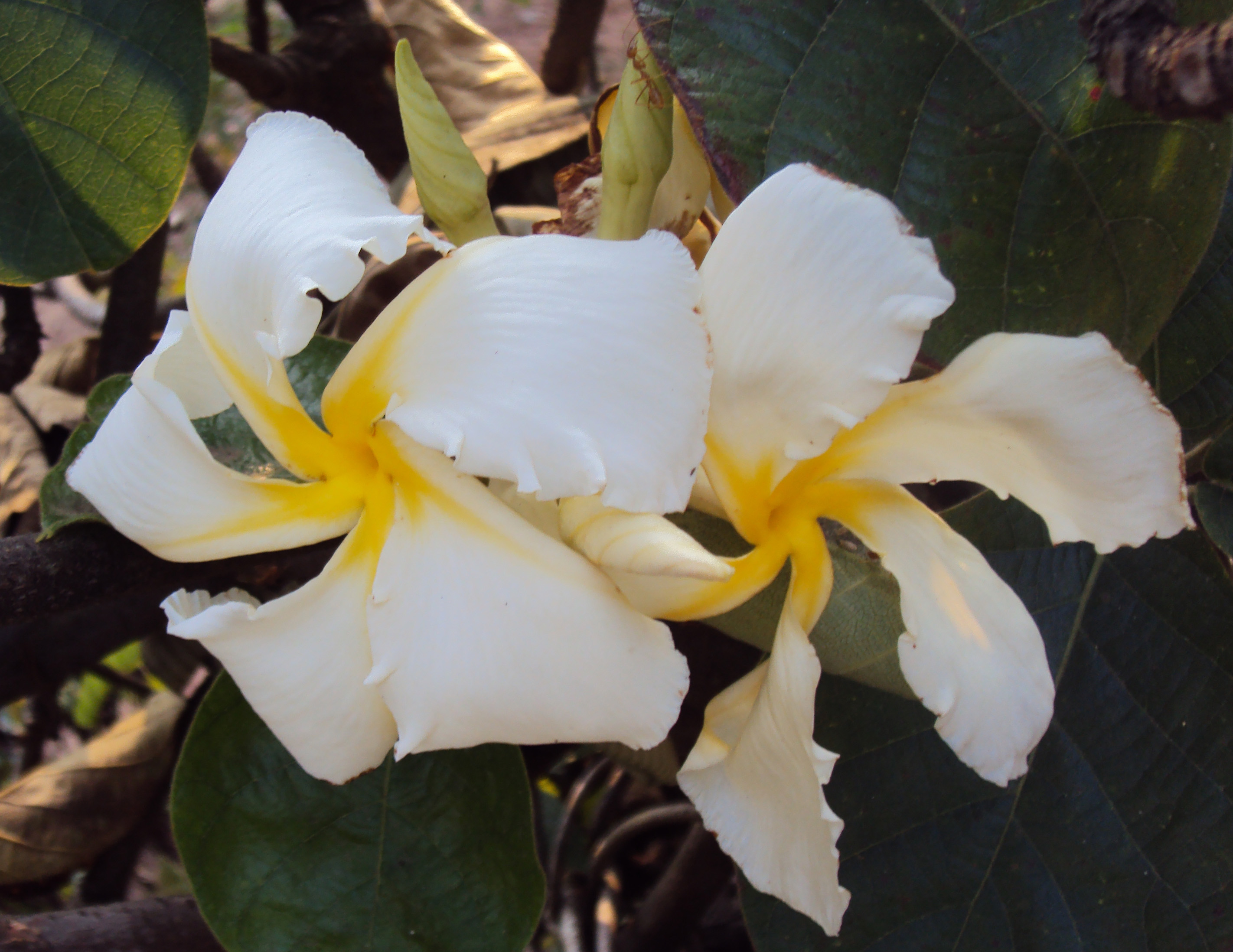
flowers of Chonemorpha fragrans

It is possible to propagate Chonemorpha fragrans via seed. These can be collected from a mature plant via paper bags placed over the flower heads. Then the pods are dried and then broken open to reveal the seeds. Germination of the seed usually takes 3–6 weeks. It can also be grown from cuttings.

The only known pests of the plant, are Spider mites, which are most common if grown in greenhouses.

== Uses ==
It has been used in folk medicine to help treat various disorders.

It is used (roots, leaves, bark-stem,) in Ayurveda (an Indian traditional medicine), to treat various things such as skin diseases, leprosy, scabies, syphilis, gynecological disorders, inflammation, constipation, worm infestations (ascaris), hyperacidity, diabetes, jaundice, coughs, bronchitis, stomach disorders, intermittent fevers, anaemia, typhoid, polyuria, boils, eye diseases, poisoning, and bronchitis. It is also used as a laxative.

The crushed roots of the plant, which are sweet and bitter, are used to make a decoction drink to help remove a retained placenta, or to treat amebic dysentery. The stem of the plant is used to treat fractures and rheumatalgia. The leaves of the plant are used a churna or extract used in combination with the other plant materials.

As the plant has diverse biological activities including muscle relaxant and antiparasitic properties.

The plant is sometimes cultivated for the fibre that is obtained from its stem, which is used to make fishing nets, especially in East Java.

== Other sources ==
- Chinese Academy of Sciences. 1959-. Flora reipublicae popularis sinicae. Note: = Chonemorpha macrophylla
- Dassanayake, M. D. & F. R. Fosberg, eds. 1980-. A revised handbook to the flora of Ceylon.
- Kiew, R. et al., eds. 2010-. Flora of peninsular Malaysia Note: Forest Research Institute Malaysia.
- Personal Care Products Council. INCI
- Rao, R. S. 1953. A revision of the Indo-Malayan species of Chonemorpha G. Don. J. Indian Bot. Soc. 32:36.
- Smitinand, T. & K. Larsen, eds. 1970-. Flora of Thailand.
- Wu Zheng-yi & P. H. Raven et al., eds. 1994-. Flora of China (English edition).
