= CRLX101 =

Ongoing cancer chemotherapy experiment

CRLX101 is an experimental approach to cancer chemotherapy that is under investigation in human trials. It is an example of a nanomedicine.

The agent represents a nanoparticle conjugate that consists of a drug delivery molecule, namely a cyclodextrin-based polymer (CDP) and an anti-cancer compound (camptothecin). It was developed by Mark E. Davis, professor of Chemical Engineering at the California Institute of Technology, and associates at Insert Therapeutics, Inc., now Calando Pharmaceuticals, Inc., hence the original name "IT-101". Its novel delivery mode allows the agent, and thus the toxic anti-cancer component, to be preferentially accumulated in cancer tissue. In turn, toxic side effect are expected to be reduced. The technology was licensed by Calando and Caltech to Cerulean Pharma, in 2009.

== Clinical trials ==
The Phase 1/2a clinical trial was conducted at the City of Hope National Medical Center, the Translational Genomics Research Institute, and San Juan Oncology Associates.

== Media ==
IT-101 and Mark E. Davis were included in a PBS documentary titled Survival.
