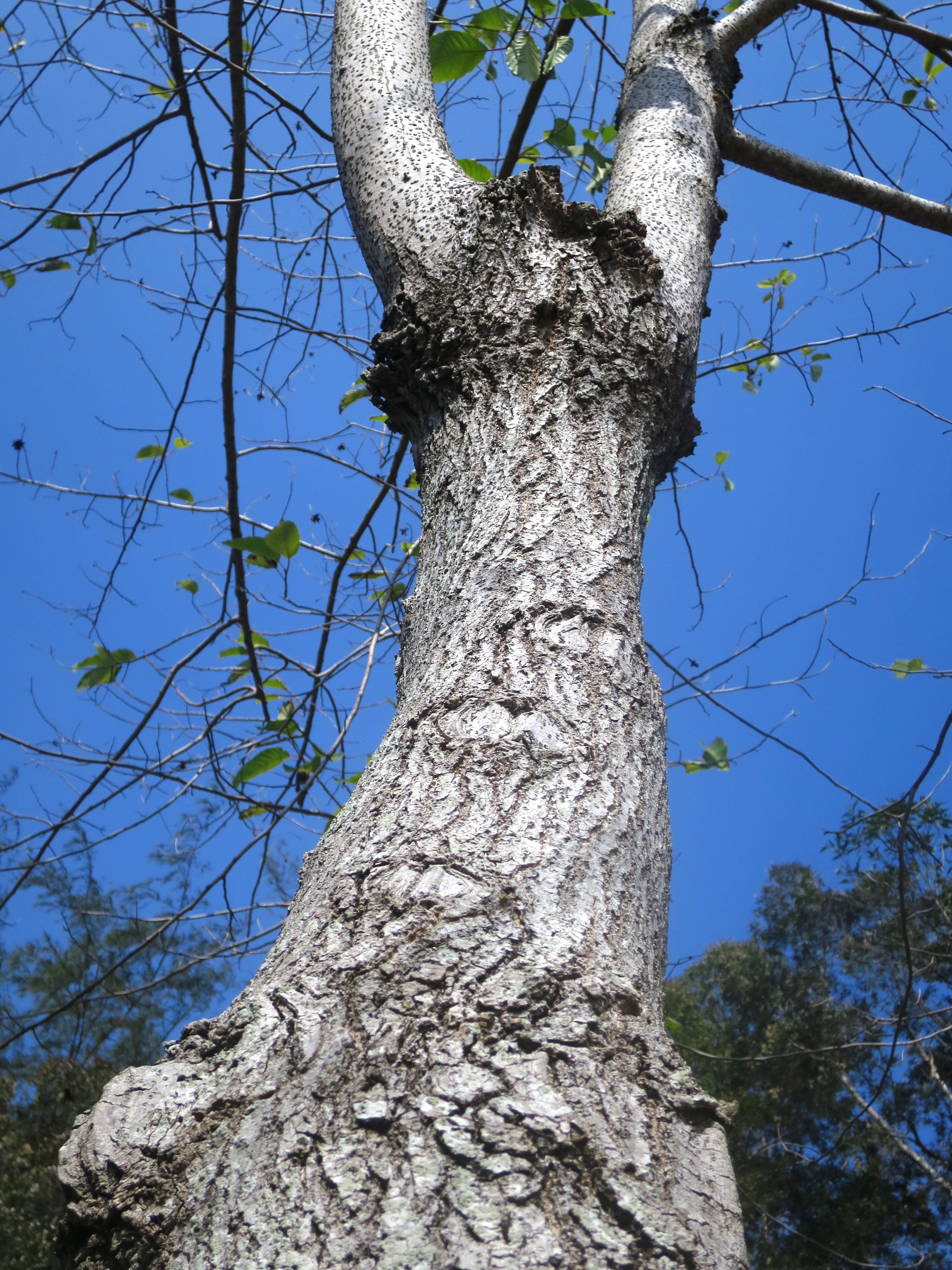
- Camptotheca acuminata

Scientific classification
- Kingdom: Plantae
- Clade: Embryophytes
- Clade: Tracheophytes
- Clade: Spermatophytes
- Clade: Angiosperms
- Clade: Eudicots
- Clade: Asterids
- Order: Cornales
- Family: Nyssaceae
- Genus: Camptotheca; Decne.

Species
- Camptotheca acuminata Camptotheca lowreyana

= Camptotheca =

Genus of flowering plants

Camptotheca (happy tree, cancer tree, or tree of life) is a genus of medium-sized deciduous trees growing to 20 metres (66 ft) tall, native to southern China and Tibet. The genus is usually included in the tupelo family Nyssaceae, but sometimes included (with the tupelos) in the dogwood family Cornaceae.

The name "happy tree" is a direct translation of the Chinese name xǐ shù (Simplified Chinese:喜树).

There are two species:

- Camptotheca acuminata Decne.
- Camptotheca lowreyana S.Y.Li

The bark and stems of C. acuminata contain the alkaloid camptothecin. Several chemical derivatives of camptothecin are under investigation for or used as drugs for cancer treatment, including irinotecan, topotecan, rubitecan.

C. acuminata also contains the chemical compounds trifolin and hyperoside.
