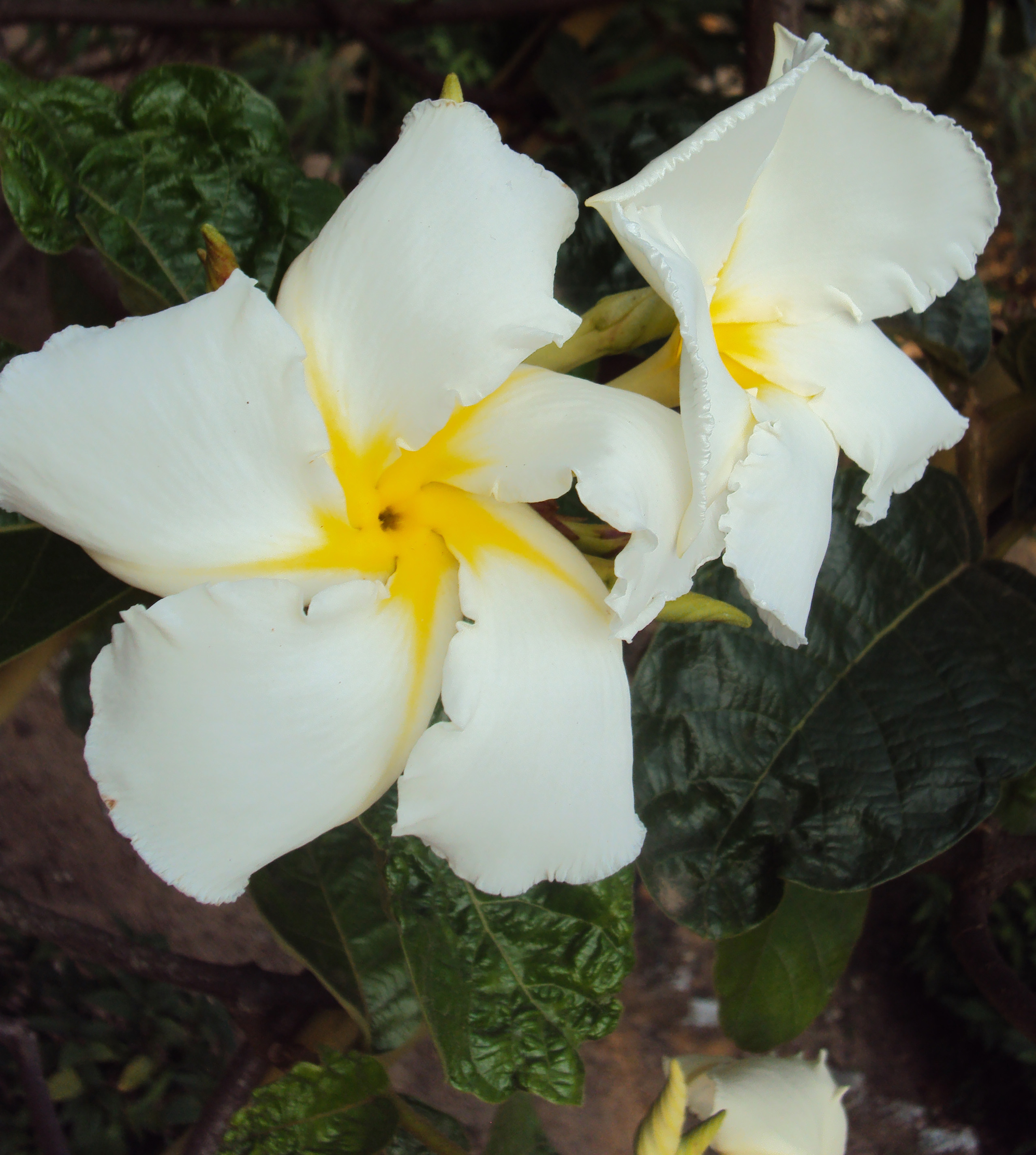
- Chonemorpha fragrans

Scientific classification
- Kingdom: Plantae
- Clade: Embryophytes
- Clade: Tracheophytes
- Clade: Spermatophytes
- Clade: Angiosperms
- Clade: Eudicots
- Clade: Asterids
- Order: Gentianales
- Family: Apocynaceae
- Subfamily: Apocynoideae
- Tribe: Apocyneae
- Genus: Chonemorpha; G.Don

Synonyms
- Beluttakaka Adans.; Epichysianthus Voigt; Rhynchodia Benth.; Triadenia Miq.

= Chonemorpha =

Genus of plants

Chonemorpha is a genus that consists of large evergreen vigorous woody vines with milky sap from India, Sri Lanka, to Southeast Asia, the Philippines and South China. Growing dormant in sub-tropical and tropical climates and usually losing leaves if temperature gets below 60 °F (16 °C). The plants have pubescent to almost tomentose branches, leaves and inflorescences. Large, corrugated, ovate leaves to 40 cm long, deep glossy green, opposite, pale and hairy beneath. Very fragrant, funnel-shaped, showy flowers to 8 cm across with long-peduncled and terminal cymes. Corolla cream with yellow center. Disk cupular with many seeds, ovate-shaped, compressed, with scanty endosperm, with a tuft of hairs at one end, dark brown. The plant is widely grown as a fence cover.

Species

- Chonemorpha assamensis Furtado - Assam, Bangladesh
- Chonemorpha eriostylis Pit. in H.Lecomte - Yunnan, Guangdong, Vietnam
- Chonemorpha floccosa Tsiang & P.T.Li - Guangxi
- Chonemorpha fragrans (Moon) Alston (frangipani vine ) - China (Guangxi, Yunnan, Tibet), Indian Subcontinent, Indochina (its name in Khmer is /vɔə crẹj cruəj/ វល្លិជ្រៃជ្រួយ or /vɔə ʔɑŋkɑt krəhɑːm/ វល្លិអង្កត់ក្រហម), Malaysia, Indonesia, Philippines
- Chonemorpha megacalyx Pierre ex Spire - Yunnan, Laos, Thailand
- Chonemorpha mollis Miq. - Java
- Chonemorpha parviflora Tsiang & P.T.Li - Yunnan, Guangxi
- Chonemorpha pedicellata Rao - W Himalayas
- Chonemorpha splendens Chun & Tsiang - Yunnan, Hainan
- Chonemorpha verrucosa (Blume) D.J.Middleton - Guangdong, Hainan, Yunnan, Bhutan, Assam, Bangladesh, Indonesia, Malaysia, Indochina

formerly included

Chonemorpha antidysenterica G.Don = Holarrhena pubescens Wall. ex G.Don
