= Narciclasine =

- × Rendered based on the entry in the Chemical Component Dictionary for the molecule with id "3KF".

Names
- Preferred IUPAC name (2S,3R,4S,4aR)-2,3,4,7-Tetrahydroxy-3,4,4a,5-tetrahydro-9H-[1,3]dioxolo[4,5-j]phenanthridin-6(2H)-one
- Other names BRN 1087400, Lycoricidin-A, Lycoricidinol, NSC 266535

Identifiers
| CAS Number | 29477-83-6 |
| 3D model (JSmol) | Interactive image |
| ChemSpider | 65310 |
| ECHA InfoCard | 100.214.093 |
| KEGG | C08533 |
| PubChem CID | 72376 |
| UNII | U3LWZ78EKQ |
| CompTox Dashboard (EPA) | DTXSID70183677 |
- InChI: InChI=1S/C14H13NO7/c16-6-1-5-4-2-7-13(22-3-21-7)11(18)8(4)14(20)15-9(5)12(19)10(6)17/h1-2,6,9-10,12,16-19H,3H2,(H,15,20)/t6-,9+,10+,12-/m0/s1 Key: LZAZURSABQIKGB-AEKGRLRDSA-N; InChI=1/C14H13NO7/c16-6-1-5-4-2-7-13(22-3-21-7)11(18)8(4)14(20)15-9(5)12(19)10(6)17/h1-2,6,9-10,12,16-19H,3H2,(H,15,20)/t6-,9+,10+,12-/m0/s1 Key: LZAZURSABQIKGB-AEKGRLRDBO
- SMILES: C1OC2=C(O1)C(=C3C(=C2)C4=C[C@@H]([C@H]([C@H]([C@@H]4NC3=O)O)O)O)O

Properties
| Chemical formula | C_{14}H_{13}NO_{7} |
| Molar mass | 307.258 g·mol^{−1} |
- Except where otherwise noted, data are given for materials in their standard state (at 25 °C [77 °F], 100 kPa). (what is ?) Infobox references

Narciclasine is a toxic alkaloid found in various Amaryllidaceae species.

== Bibliography ==
- Gwendoline Van Goietsenoven; Véronique Mathieu; Florence Lefranc; Alexander Kornienko; Antonio Evidente; Robert Kiss (March 2013). "Narciclasine as well as other Amaryllidaceae Isocarbostyrils are Promising GTP-ase Targeting Agents against Brain Cancers". Medicinal Research Reviews. 33 (2): 439–455. doi:10.1002/med.21253. PMID 22419031.
