= Chong Kun Dang =

South Korean pharmaceutical company

- Native name: 종근당
- Type: Public
- Industry: Pharmaceuticals
- Founded: May 7, 1941; 85 years ago as Goongbon Pharmacy in Seoul, South Korea
- Founder: Lee Jong-kun
- Headquarters: Seoul, South Korea
- Key people: Kim Young-joo (CEO)
- Revenue: ▲ ₩1.49 trillion (2022) (US$1.15 billion)
- Net income: ▲ ₩80.95 billion (2022)
- Number of employees: 2,396 (2022)
- Parent: Chong Kun Dang Holdings
- Website: ckdpharm.com

- Chong Kun Dang
- Hangul: 종근당
- Hanja: 鍾根堂
- RR: Jonggeundang
- MR: Chonggŭndang

Chong Kun Dang (Korean: 종근당) is a South Korean multinational pharmaceutical company headquartered in Seoul. Founded as Goongbon Pharmacy under Japanese rule in 1941, it was renamed in 1946 and has since become one of the largest pharmaceutical manufacturers in the country.

== History ==
In May 1941, Lee Jong-kun founded a pharmacy in the Ahyeon-dong neighborhood of downtown Seoul amidst Japanese rule in Korea; it was known as Goongbon Pharmacy in Korean and Miyamoto in Japanese. Following the end of the colonial era, Lee renamed the pharmacy to Chong Kun Dang in 1946. In 1949, Lee established the company's first research lab, where it developed Korea's first-ever thiadiazole ointment.

By 1951, Chong Kun Dang grew beyond its origin as a small pharmacy and began wholesaling its products. The company was first registered as a corporation in 1956, at which point it had 30 drug formulas in production.

In 1965, Chong Kun Dang established the largest raw material pharmaceutical processing plant in Asia. In 1968, it became the first Korean drug manufacturer to receive approval from the Food and Drug Administration to sell in the United States. The company began exporting its products with American and British partnerships in 1971 and 1972 respectively.

In 1983, Chong Kun Dang partnered with Swiss healthcare corporation Roche to create Roche Korea, the multinational organization's branch in the country. In 1989, Chong Kun Dang manufactured Sokcheon, its first liquid-based indigestion medicine.

On November 23, 2020, Chong Kun Dang announced it had acquired the Korean distribution rights to SkyLabs's heart-monitoring ring. The deal, worth ₩2.5 billion (US$2.2 million), also granted Chong Kun Dang priority in negotiations for distribution rights in China, India, Japan, and the Middle East. Chong Kun Dang began retailing the product in Korea in December 2020.

On November 6, 2023, Chong Kun Dang agreed to a ₩1.7 trillion (US$1.3 billion) technology export contract with multinational corporation Novartis. The contract granted Novartis the global distribution rights for Chong Kun Dang's CKD-510, a histone deacetylase inhibitor posited as a potential treatment for Charcot–Marie–Tooth disease.
