= Insert Therapeutics =

American Company

Insert Therapeutics, Inc., now Calando Pharmaceuticals, Inc., is a medical research company that uses nanobiotechnology specializing in therapeutic agents that are conjugated, to facilitate and enhance drug delivery. The small company was founded in 2000, is located in Pasadena, California, and is owned by Arrowhead Research Corporation.

The conjugates consist of a cyclodextrin-containing polymer (Cyclosert) that acts as a drug delivery system, and a linked medication, such as a chemotherapeutic drug of already proven efficacy. The size of the polymer is designed to “fit” the specific target, as vessels in a neoplasm allow for leakage of different sizes of polymers, as in healthy tissue. The leaked conjugates are concentrated in the target area. As a result, chemotherapeutic activity is locally enhanced, while general side effects are decreased.

At least one of their conjugates, IT-101, has been investigated in a clinical trial at City of Hope National Medical Center.
