= Camptothecin =

Chemical compound

Clinical data
- ATC code: none

Identifiers
- IUPAC name: (S)-4-ethyl-4-hydroxy-1H-pyrano[3',4':6,7]indolizino[1,2-b] quinoline-3,14-(4H,12H)-dione
- CAS Number: 7689-03-4
- PubChem CID: 2538
- DrugBank: DB04690
- ChemSpider: 22775
- UNII: XT3Z54Z28A
- KEGG: C01897
- ChEBI: CHEBI:27656
- ChEMBL: ChEMBL65
- CompTox Dashboard (EPA): DTXSID0030956
- ECHA InfoCard: 100.113.172

Chemical and physical data
- Formula: C_{20}H_{16}N_{2}O_{4}
- Molar mass: 348.358 g·mol^{−1}
- 3D model (JSmol): Interactive image
- Melting point: 275 to 277 °C (527 to 531 °F)
- SMILES: O=C\1N4\C(=C/C2=C/1COC(=O)[C@]2(O)CC)c3nc5c(cc3C4)cccc5
- InChI: InChI=1S/C20H16N2O4/c1-2-20(25)14-8-16-17-12(7-11-5-3-4-6-15(11)21-17)9-22(16)18(23)13(14)10-26-19(20)24/h3-8,25H,2,9-10H2,1H3/t20-/m0/s1; Key:VSJKWCGYPAHWDS-FQEVSTJZSA-N

Camptothecin (CPT) is a topoisomerase inhibitor. It was discovered in 1966 by Monroe Eliot Wall and Mansukh C. Wani in systematic screening of natural products for anticancer drugs. It was isolated from the bark of Camptotheca acuminata (喜树 "Happy tree"), a tree native to China used in traditional Chinese medicine. It has been used clinically in China for the treatment of gastrointestinal tumors. CPT showed anticancer activity in preliminary clinical trials, especially against breast, ovarian, colon, lung, and stomach cancers. However, it has low solubility and adverse effects have been reported when used therapeutically, so synthetic and medicinal chemists have developed numerous syntheses of camptothecin and various derivatives to increase the benefits of the chemical, with good results. Four CPT analogues have been approved and are used in cancer chemotherapy today: topotecan, irinotecan, belotecan, and trastuzumab deruxtecan. Camptothecin has also been found in other plants including Chonemorpha fragrans.

== Structures ==
CPT has a planar pentacyclic ring structure, that includes a pyrrolo[3,4-β]-quinoline moiety (rings A, B and C), conjugated pyridone moiety (ring D) and one chiral center at position 20 within the alpha-hydroxy lactone ring with (S) configuration (the E-ring). Its planar structure is thought to be one of the most important factors in topoisomerase inhibition.

Binding of CPT to topoisomerase I and DNA

== Binding ==
CPT binds to the topoisomerase I and DNA complex (the covalent complex) resulting in a ternary complex, and thereby stabilizing it. This prevents DNA re-ligation and therefore causes DNA damage which results in apoptosis. CPT binds both to the enzyme and DNA with hydrogen bonds. The most important part of the structure is the E-ring which interacts from three different positions with the enzyme. The hydroxyl group in position 20 forms hydrogen bond to the side chain on aspartic acid number 533 (Asp533) in the enzyme. It is critical that the configuration of the chiral carbon is (S) because (R) is inactive. The lactone is bonded with two hydrogen bonds to the amino groups on arginine 364 (Arg364). The D-ring interacts with the +1 cytosine on non-cleaved strand and stabilizes the topoisomerase I-DNA covalent complex by forming hydrogen bond. This hydrogen bond is between carbonyl group in position 17 on the D-ring and amino group on the pyrimidine ring of +1 cytosine. CPT is selectively cytotoxic to the cells replicating DNA during S phase and its toxicity is primarily a result of conversion of single-strand breaks into double-strand breaks when the replication fork collides with the cleavage complexes formed by DNA and CPT.

== Chemistry ==
The D and E rings are susceptible to hydrolysis. The open E ring form is inactive and it must therefore be closed to inhibit topoisomerase I. The closed form is favored in acidic condition, as it is in many cancer cells microenvironment. CPT is transported into the cell by passive diffusion. Cellular uptake is favored by lipophilicity, which enhances intracellular accumulation. Lipophilicity makes compounds more stable because of improved lactone partitioning into red blood cells and consequently less hydrolysis of the lactone. CPT has affinity for human serum albumin (HSA), especially the carboxylate form of CPT. Because of that, the equilibrium between the lactone ring and the carboxylate form is driven toward the carboxylate. Reduced drug-HSA interactions could result in improved activity.

== Structure-activity relationship ==
Camptothecin

Studies have shown that substitution at position 7, 9, 10 and 11 can have positive effect on CPT activity and physical properties, e.g. potency and metabolic stability. Enlargement of the lactone ring by one CH_{2} unit also enhances its abilities, as in homocamptothecin. Substitution at position 12 and 14 leads to inactive derivative.

=== A- and B-ring modification ===
==== Alkyl substitution ====
Alkyl substitution at position 7 has shown increased cytotoxicity, such as ethyl (C_{2}H_{5}) or chloromethyl (CH_{2}Cl). These groups are able to react with the DNA in the presence of topoisomerase I which leads to more tumor activity. It has also been shown that increasing the length of the carbon chain (in position 7) leads to increased lipophilicity and consequently greater potency and stability in human plasma. Other 7-modified CPT analogues are silatecans and karenitecins. They are potent inhibitors on topoisomerase I and both have alkylsilyl groups in position 7 which make them lipophilic and more stable. Silatecans or 7-silylcampthothecins have shown reduced drug-HSA interactions which contributes to its blood stability and they can also cross the blood brain barrier. DB-67 is a 10-hydroxy derivative and is among the most active silatecans. BNP1350 which belongs to the series of karenitecins exhibits cytotoxic activity and ability to overcome drug resistance. Still another route to make CPT's lipophilic is to introduce lipophilic substituents, such as iminomethyl or oxyiminomethyl moieties. One of the most potent compounds is the oxyiminomethyl derivative ST1481 that has the advantage to overcome drug resistance caused by transport systems. Basic nitrogen in a carbon chain at position 7 makes the compound more hydrophilic and hence more water-soluble. For example, is a derivate called CKD-602, which is a potent topoisomerase I inhibitor and successfully overcomes the poor water solubility and toxicity seen with CPT.

Considerably greater activity can be achieved by putting electron-withdrawing groups like amino, nitro, bromo or chloro at position 9 and 10 and hydroxyl group at position 10 or 11. But these compounds are relatively insoluble in aqueous solutions, which causes difficulty in administrations. Methoxy group at both position 10 and 11 simultaneously leads to inactivity.

==== Hexacyclic CPT analogues ====
Hexacyclic CPT analogues have shown great potency. For example, methylenedioxy or ethylenedioxy group connected between 10 and 11 form a 5 or 6 membered ring which leads to more water-soluble derivates and increased potency. Researches have shown that ethylenedioxy analogues are less potent than methylenedioxy. The reason is the unfavorable steric interactions of ethylenedioxy analogues with the enzyme.

Adding amino or chloro group at 9th position or chloromethyl group at 7th position to these 10, 11-methylenedioxy or ethylenedioxy analogues results in compounds with even greater cytotoxicity but weaker solubility in water. Introducing a water solubilising substituent at position 7 can yield 10, 11-methylenedioxy or ethylenedioxy analogues with good water solubility. Lurtotecan meets those requirements. It is a 10, 11-ethylenedioxy analogue with a 4-methylpiperazino-methylene at position 7.

A ring can also be formed between position 7 and 9, like position 10 and 11. That gives new opportunities to make water-soluble derivatives [5]. These hexacyclic CPT become more active when electron-withdrawing groups are put in position 11 and methyl or amino groups at 10. Exatecan is an example of hexacyclic CPT that has a 6 membered ring over position 7 and 9, and is 10-methyl, 11-fluoro substituted [4]. It is water-soluble and more potent than topotecan.

=== C- and D-ring modification ===
The C- and D-rings have an essential role in the antitumor activity. Replacement in any position results in much less potent compound than parent compound in other cytotoxicity assay.

Homocamptothecin

=== E-ring modifications ===
The E-ring doesn't allow many structural changes without losing CPT activity because it is necessary for binding to the active site of TOP I. One possible replacement is changing the hydroxyl group to Cl, F or Br because their polarizability is sufficient to stabilize the enzyme-complex.

Another possible modification is to insert a methylene between hydroxyl and lactone on the E-ring yielding a seven membered β-hydroxylactone group, so-called homocamptothecin (hCPT). The hCPT's hydroxyl has less inductive effect on the carboxyl group which makes the lactone very reactive. This enhances the interaction of the free hydroxyl group optimally with topoisomerase I and the covalent complex that forms in its presence are more stable. The E-ring of hCPT opens more slowly and the opening is irreversible. hCPTs exhibit enhanced human plasma stability because of decreased protein binding and more affinity for red blood cells than CPT.

== CPT analogues ==
Since the discovery of CPT many analogues have been synthesized. Below is a schematic view of the CPT analogues that have been mentioned in the text above.

Camptothecin with radicals
Analogue	R^{1}	R^{2}	R^{3}	R^{4}
Topotecan	—H		—OH	—H
Irinotecan (CPT-11)		—H		—H
Silatecan (DB-67, AR-67)		—H	—OH	—H
Cositecan (BNP-1350)		—H	—H	—H
Exatecan			—CH_{3}	—F
Lurtotecan		—H		
Gimatecan (ST1481)		—H	—H	—H
Belotecan (CKD-602)		—H	—H	—H
Rubitecan	—H		—H	—H

CPT is linked to a cyclodextrin-based polymer to form the investigational anti-cancer drug CRLX101.

== Biosynthesis ==
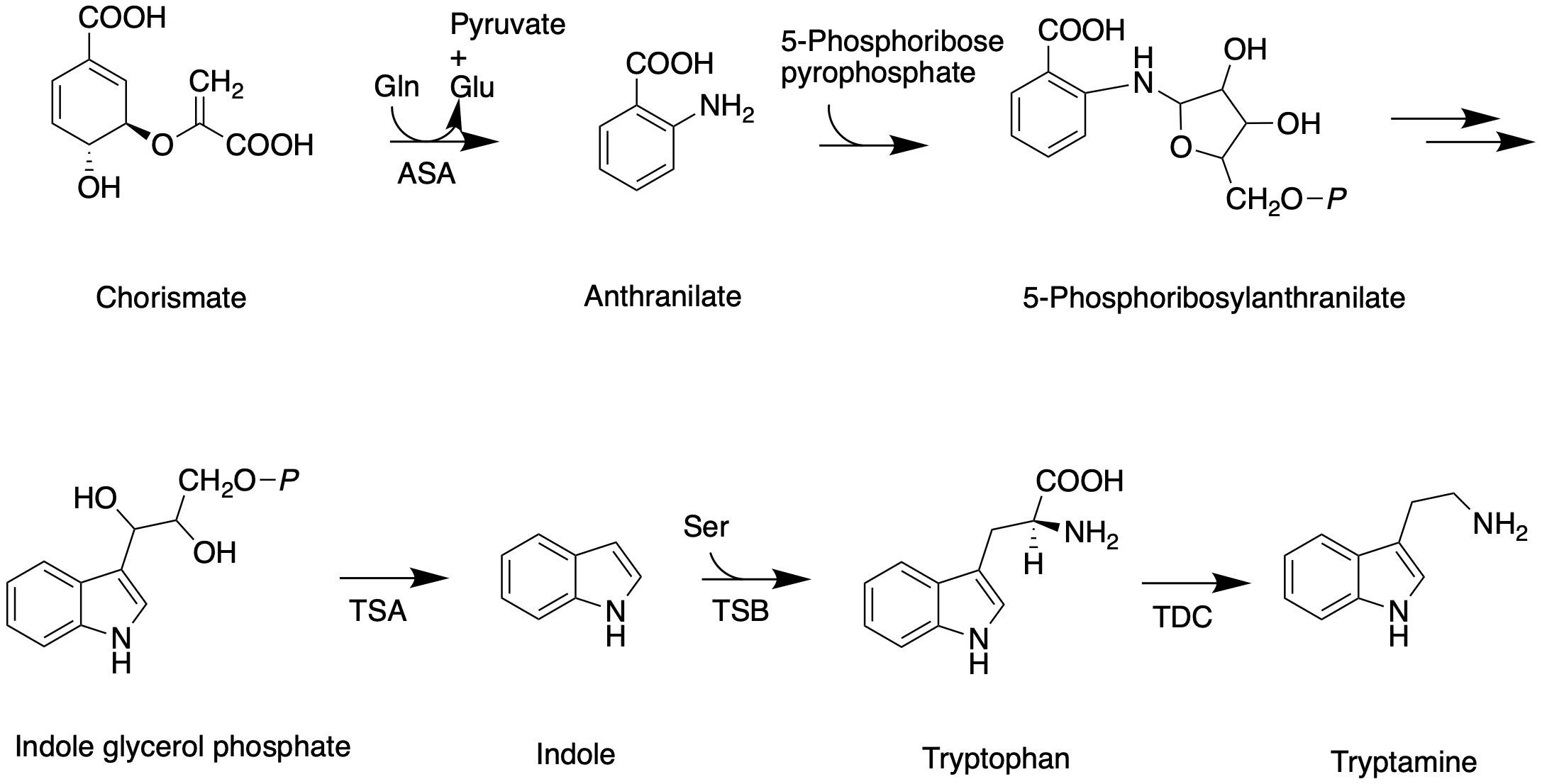
1 Tryptamine biosynthesis pathway

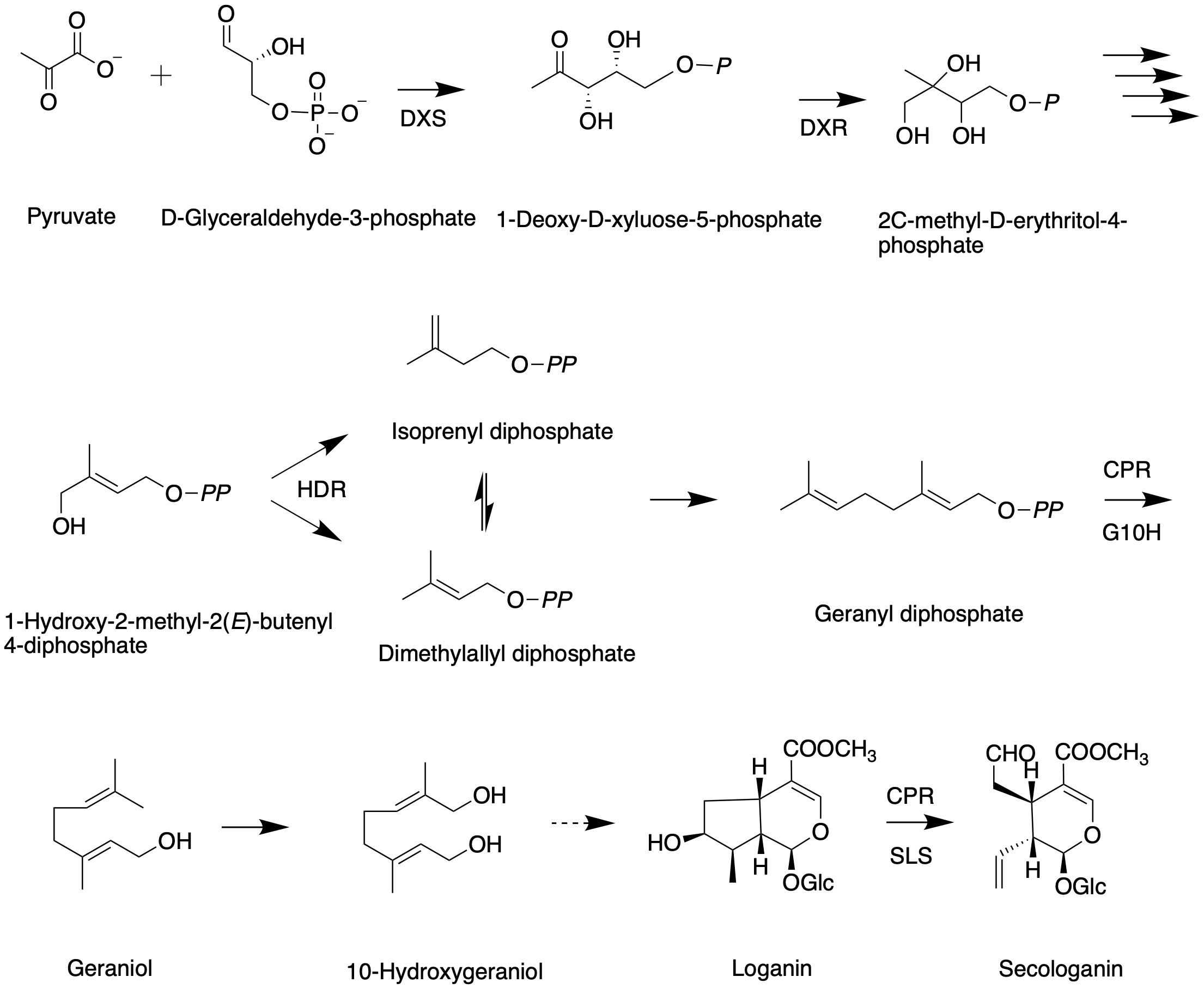
2 Secologanin biosynthesis pathway

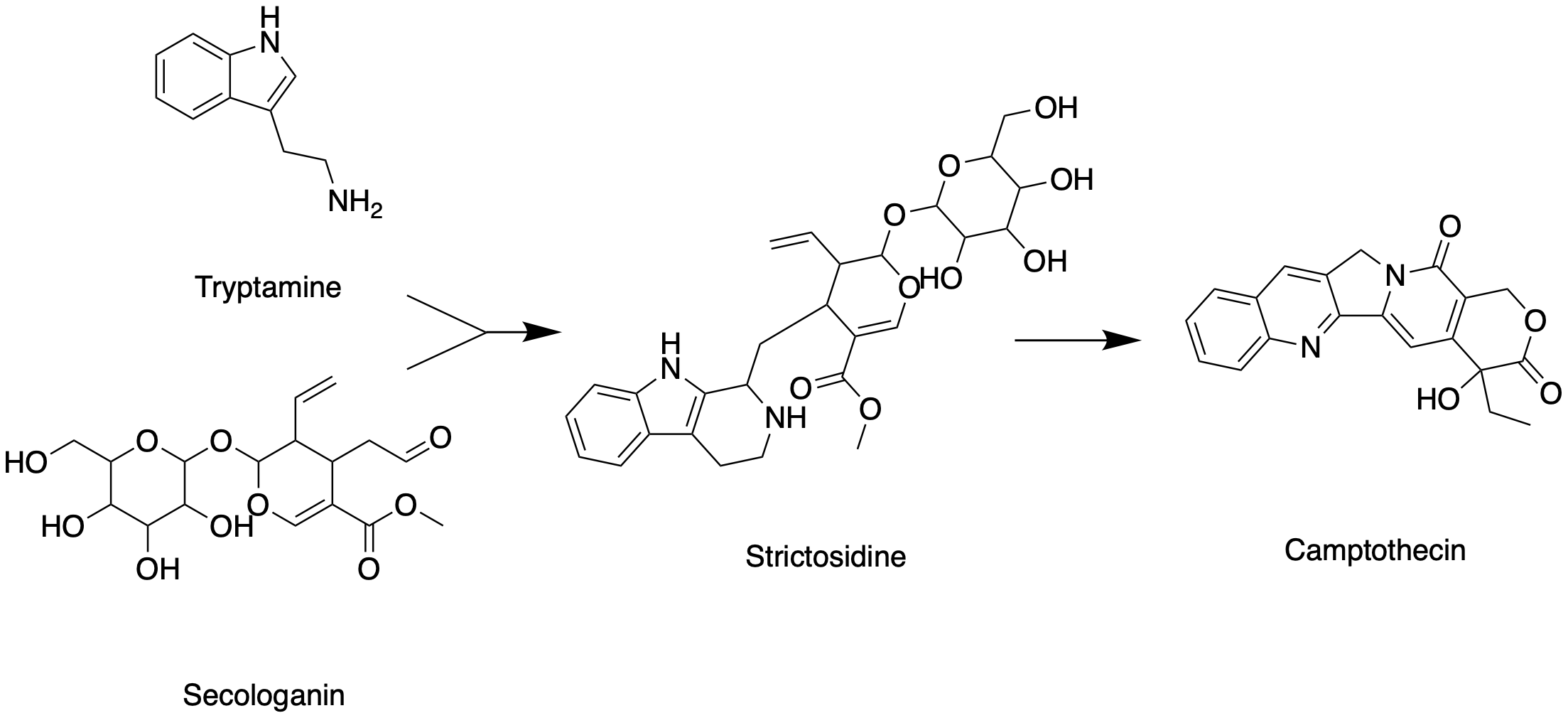
Tryptamine and strictosidine to camptothecin

Like all other monoterpenoid indole-alkaloids, biosynthesis of camptothecin requires production of the strictosidine. Strictosidine is synthesized through condensation reaction between tryptamine from shikimate pathway and secologanin from either mevalonate (MVA) pathway or non-mevalonate pathway (MEP). Strictosidine then undergoes intermolecular cyclization to produce strictosamide, which is converted to camptothecin through a series of oxidation reactions by enzymes that still needs to be resolved.

The shikimate pathway leading to biosynthesis of tryptamine is mostly understood. First, chorismate is converted to anthranilate by the alpha-subunit of anthranilate synthase (ASA). Anthranilate reacts with 5-phosphoribose pyrophosphate to produce 5-phosphoribosylanthranilate. Then this intermediate is converted to indole glycerol phosphate, which interacts with the alpha-subunit of tryptophan synthase (TSA) to yield indole. The beta-subunit of tryptophan synthase (TSB) catalyzes condensation of indole with serine, leading to tryptophan. In the next step, tryptamine is produced as the result of decarboxylation by tryptophan decarboxylase (TDC).

Secologanin synthesis begins with condensation reaction between pyruvate and D-Glyceraldehyde-3-phosphate catalyzed by 1-deoxy-D-xylulose-5-phosphate synthase (DXS) to produce 1-deoxy-D-xylulose-5-phosphate (DXP). The conversion of DXP to isopentenyl diphosphate (IPP), which is the common terpenoid biosynthesis precursor involves 1-deoxy-D-xylulose-5-phosphate reductoisomerase (DXR) and 1-hydroxy-2-methyl-2(E)-butenyl-4-diphosphate reductase (HDR). The formation of IPP can be achieved by both MVA and MEP pathways. Condensation of IPP and dimethylallyl diphosphate (DMAPP) yields geranyl diphosphate (GPP). The geraniol synthase (GS) then converts GPP to geraniol. The conversion of geraniol to secologanin occurs through various enzymatic reactions. Based on studies with radioactive labelling and pathway specific inhibitors, MEP pathway is the primary source for secologanin. Tryptamine from shikimate pathway and secologanin from MVA or MEP pathway are converted to strictosidine through a condensation reaction catalyzed by strictosidine synthase. Although it is not fully resolved, it has been postulated that camptothecin is produced from strictosidine via strictosamide, 3 (S)-pumiloside and 3 (S)-deoxypumiloside.
