= Topotecan =

Chemical compound

Clinical data
- Trade names: Hycamtin, others
- AHFS/Drugs.com: Monograph
- MedlinePlus: a610007
- License data: US DailyMed: Topotecan
- Pregnancy category: AU: D
- Routes of administration: Intravenous infusion, by mouth
- ATC code: L01CE01 (WHO)

Legal status
- Legal status: AU: S4 (Prescription only); UK: POM (Prescription only); US: ℞-only; EU: Rx-only

Pharmacokinetic data
- Bioavailability: 31.4 % in humans
- Protein binding: 35%
- Metabolism: Liver
- Elimination half-life: 2–3 hours
- Excretion: Kidney

Identifiers
- IUPAC name: (S)-10-[(dimethylamino)methyl]-4-ethyl-4,9-dihydroxy-1H-pyrano[3',4':6,7]indolizino[1,2-b]quinoline-3,14(4H,12H)-dione monohydrochloride
- CAS Number: 123948-87-8 119413-54-6 (hydrochloride)
- PubChem CID: 60700
- IUPHAR/BPS: 7101
- DrugBank: DB01030
- ChemSpider: 54705
- UNII: 7M7YKX2N15
- KEGG: D08618; D02168
- ChEMBL: ChEMBL84
- CompTox Dashboard (EPA): DTXSID3042685
- ECHA InfoCard: 100.213.372

Chemical and physical data
- Formula: C_{23}H_{23}N_{3}O_{5}
- Molar mass: 421.453 g·mol^{−1}
- 3D model (JSmol): Interactive image
- SMILES: O=C\1N4\C(=C/C2=C/1COC(=O)[C@]2(O)CC)c3nc5c(cc3C4)c(c(O)cc5)CN(C)C
- InChI: InChI=1S/C23H23N3O5/c1-4-23(30)16-8-18-20-12(9-26(18)21(28)15(16)11-31-22(23)29)7-13-14(10-25(2)3)19(27)6-5-17(13)24-20/h5-8,27,30H,4,9-11H2,1-3H3/t23-/m0/s1; Key:UCFGDBYHRUNTLO-QHCPKHFHSA-N

Topotecan, sold under the brand name Hycamtin among others, is a chemotherapeutic agent medication that is a topoisomerase inhibitor. It is a synthetic, water-soluble analog of the natural chemical compound camptothecin. It is used in the form of its hydrochloride salt to treat ovarian cancer, lung cancer and other cancer types.

After GlaxoSmithKline received final FDA approval for topotecan on 15 October 2007, it became the first topoisomerase I inhibitor for oral use.

== Uses ==
- Ovarian cancer (FDA May 1996).
- Cervical cancer (FDA June 2006).
- Small cell lung carcinoma (SCLC) (FDA Oct 2007).

=== Experimental uses ===
As of 2016, experiments were under way for neuroblastoma, brainstem glioma, Ewing's sarcoma and Angelman syndrome. In addition, topotecan is experimentally treating non-small cell lung cancer, colorectal cancer, breast cancer, non-Hodgkin lymphoma, endometrial cancer, and oligodendroglioma.

=== Angelman syndrome ===
Angelman syndrome is a neuro-genetic disorder characterized by severe developmental delays, seizures, speech impairments and physical impairments. It is an epigenetic disease and other treatments focus on symptoms. It is caused by a deletion or mutation of the maternal allele for the ubiquitin protein ligase E3A (UBE3A). UBE3A is expressed in most body tissues. However, in neurons only the maternal copy of the gene is expressed. UBE3A is located on chromosome 15 and the paternal copy for the gene is genetically imprinted and is silenced by an antisense RNA transcript. The maternal copy control center of the gene is methylated, suppressing transcription in the antisense direction while the paternal copy control center is unmethylated.

Treatment involves unsilencing the paternal allele allowing the normal paternal UBE3A allele to be transcribed. UBE3A, in normal function, adds ubiquitin chains to proteins to target unnecessary or damaged proteins for degradation by the proteasome.

16 topoisomerase inhibitors unsilence paternal UBE3A. Topoisomerases are enzymes that regulate the unwinding of DNA. Of these 16 inhibitors, topotecan was found to induce the strongest upregulation of UBE3A. The enzymes bind to the DNA and cut the phosphate backbone, allowing the DNA to be unwound. Topotecan unsilences the paternal UBE2A allele by reducing the transcription of an antisense transcript. Topotecan inhibits topoisomerase I restoring UBE3A levels to wild-type range in cultured mice neurons.

Transgenic mice with a fluorescently tagged UBE3A were used to test the effectiveness of unsilencing the paternal copy. When tested on mice in vivo, topotecan affected the hippocampus, striatum and cerebral cortex but not the cerebellum unless a higher dose was administered (21.6 micrograms/hour for five days). The study suggested that the topoisomerase inhibitors have the potential to produce a normally functioning UBE3A protein. Most symptoms due to Angelman syndrome are traditionally treated by speech therapy, physical therapy and occupational therapy. Anti-seizure medication is often prescribed as seizures are a common symptom of Angelman syndrome. These treatments target only symptoms.

This drug has been administered to cancer patients. It was well tolerated when administered to pediatric and adult patients.

== Mechanism of action ==
Topotecan is a semi-synthetic derivative of camptothecin. Camptothecin is a natural product extracted from the bark of the tree Camptotheca acuminata. Topoisomerase-I is a nuclear enzyme that relieves torsional strain in DNA by opening single strand breaks. Once topoisomerase-I creates a single strand break, the DNA can rotate in front of the advancing replication fork. In physiological environments, topotecan is in equilibrium with its inactive carboxylate form. Topotecan's active lactone form intercalates between DNA bases in the topoisomerase-I cleavage complex. The binding of topotecan in the cleavage complex prevents topoisomerase-I from religating the nicked DNA strand after relieving the strain. This intercalation therefore traps the topoisomerase-I in the cleavage complex bound to the DNA. When the replication-fork collides with the trapped topoisomerase-I, DNA damage occurs. The unbroken DNA strand breaks and mammalian cells cannot efficiently repair these double strand breaks. The accumulation of trapped topoisomerase-I complexes is a known response to apoptotic stimuli. This disruption prevents DNA replication and ultimately leads to cell death. This process leads to breaks in the DNA strand resulting in apoptosis. Administration of topotecan down-regulates its target, topoisomerase-I; therefore, it is dosed to maximize efficacy and minimize related toxicity. Topotecan is often given in combination with paclitaxel as first line treatment for extensive-stage small-cell lung cancer.

== Side effects ==
- Myelosuppression, specifically neutropenia, leukopenia, anemia, and thrombocytopenia
- Diarrhea, nausea, vomiting, stomatitis, and constipation
- Increased susceptibility to infections
- Asthenia

== Generic versions ==
Two generic versions have been approved in the European Union. In Nov 2010 the US FDA approved a generic version.

== Sources ==
- Bailus BJ, Segal DJ (June 2014). "The prospect of molecular therapy for Angelman syndrome and other monogenic neurologic disorders". BMC Neuroscience. 15 76. doi:10.1186/1471-2202-15-76. PMC 4069279. PMID 24946931.
