= CDK inhibitor =

Any chemical that inhibits the function of CDKs

A CDK (cyclin-dependent kinase) inhibitor is any chemical that inhibits the function of CDKs. They are used to treat cancers by preventing overproliferation of cancer cells. The US FDA approved the first drug of this type, palbociclib (Ibrance), a CDK4/6 inhibitor, in February 2015, for use in postmenopausal women with breast cancer that is estrogen receptor positive and HER2 negative. While there are multiple cyclin/CDK complexes regulating the cell cycle, CDK inhibitors targeting CDK4/6 have been the most successful; four CDK4/6 inhibitors have been FDA approved. No inhibitors targeting other CDKs have been FDA approved, but several compounds are in clinical trials.

== CDKs as cancer target ==
See also Ribociclib#Mechanism of action re: CDK4

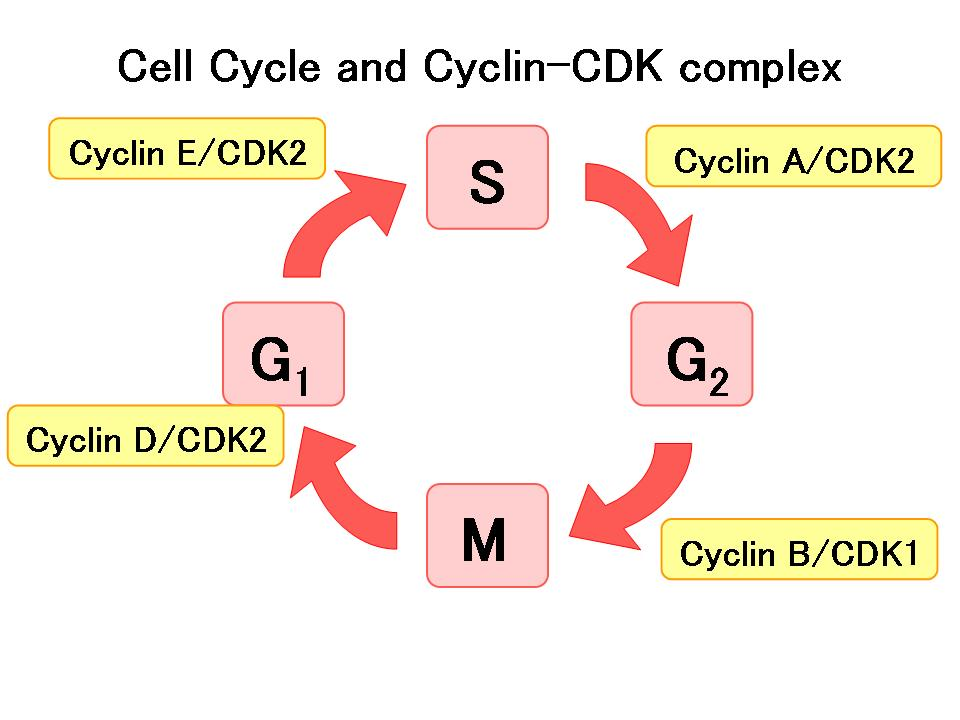
The cyclin-CDK complexes associated with each phase of the cell cycle. These CDKs are the target of CDK inhibitors in order to cause cell cycle arrest and prevent unwanted cell proliferation.

The cell cycle is a highly regulated process governing cell division and is controlled by several cyclins and CDKs. Cyclins phosphorylate CDKs, forming complexes that stabilize them and allow them to enact their function. While cyclins activate CDKs, there are other regulatory molecules that can inhibit their function. Under normal conditions, the activation and inhibition of CDK complexes controls the behavior of the cell at many important cell cycle checkpoints to regulate healthy division. However, this process can become dysregulated, leading to the uncontrolled division of cells known as cancer. In fact, in many human cancers, CDKs are overactive or CDK-inhibiting proteins are not functional. CDK inhibitors as a therapy emerged from the idea that order could be restored to an overreactive cell cycle by inhibiting the CDKs whose activation drives the cell cycle forward. Therefore, it is rational to target CDK function to prevent unregulated proliferation of cancer cells.

However, the validity of CDK as a cancer target should be carefully assessed because genetic studies have revealed that knockout of one specific type of CDK often does not affect proliferation of cells or has an effect only in specific tissue types. For example, most adult cells in mice proliferate normally even without both CDK4 and CDK2.

Furthermore, specific CDKs are only active in certain periods of the cell cycle. Therefore, the pharmacokinetics and dosing schedule of the candidate compound must be carefully evaluated to maintain active concentration of the drug throughout the entire cell cycle.

=== Limitations ===
Another remaining question surrounding CDK inhibitors as a therapy is if certain cancers will evade or be resistant to treatment. One study showed that 20% of the patients being treated for metastatic ER+ HER2-breast cancer did not respond at all to treatment with a CDK4/6 inhibitor due to preexisting mutations allowing the cancer cells to continue proliferating despite treatment with the drug. Other studies have shown this number to be as high as 30%. Another study notes that the usefulness of CDK4/6 in the clinical may be limited by acquired drug resistance. In this study, treatment with CDK4/6 inhibitors in ER+ breast cancer and non-small cell lung carcinoma harboring KRAS mutations resulted in upregulation of cyclin D1, CDK4, and cyclin E1, negating the effects of administering the drug.

== Types ==
Malumbres et al., categorized CDK inhibitors based on their target specificity:

=== Broad CDK inhibitors ===
- Compounds targeting a broad spectrum of CDKs
- Also known as pan-CDK inhibitors
- Many of the initial CDK inhibitor drugs that entered clinical trials were pan-CDK inhibitors
- These initial drugs exhibited high levels of toxicity and off-target effects due to a lack of specificity, so many were discontinued
- There are still ongoing efforts to bring pan-CDK inhibitors to clinical use

=== Specific CDK inhibitors ===
- Compounds targeting a specific type of CDK
- Shown to decrease off-target effects
- Developed in response to issues implementing pan-CDK inhibitors
- Evidence shows that different tumor types express different levels of CDKs, necessitating that specific CDK inhibitors be tested for clinical effectiveness in each cancer type

=== Multiple Target Inhibitors ===
- Compounds targeting CDKs as well as additional kinases such as VEGFR or PDGFR

== Approved ==
=== CDK4/CDK6 inhibitors ===
The current FDA approved drugs are all CDK4/6 inhibitors targeting CDK4 and CDK6, two enzymes that control the cell cycle checkpoint transition checkpoint from the G1 to the S phase of the cell cycle. These cell cycle inhibitors work by inducing cell cycle arrest at G1.

Several drugs have been approved by the US FDA for HR-positive, HER2-negative breast cancer.

1. Palbociclib (PD-033299, trade name Ibrance) gave encouraging results in a phase II clinical trial on patients with HR-positive, HER2-negative advanced breast cancer. The addition of PD-0332991 to letrozole trebled median time to disease progression to 26.1 months compared with 7.5 months for letrozole alone. The FDA granted it Accelerated Approval in Feb 2015.

2. Ribociclib (LEE011, trade names Kisqali and Kryxana), is US FDA approved in combination with letrozole for treatment of breast cancer in patients with HR-positive, HER2-negative advanced metastatic breast cancer. A phase three clinical trial found that ribociclib administered in combination with letrozole increased the likelihood of progression free survival to 63% in the first 18 months of therapy versus 42% for letrozole alone. Subsequent analysis demonstrated that patients treated with ribociclib and letrozole showed a median progression-free survival of 25.3 months.

3. Abemaciclib (LY2835219, trade name Verzenio) was approved in September 2017 by the FDA for "adult patients who have hormone receptor (HR)-positive, human epidermal growth factor receptor 2 (HER2)-negative advanced or metastatic breast cancer that has progressed after taking therapy that alters a patient's hormones".

One drug has been FDA approved for mediating chemotherapy-induced side effects.

4. Trilaciclib (V03AF12, trade name Cosela) was approved in February 2021 to reduce chemotherapy-induced myelosuppression in patients with late-stage small-cell lung cancer (ES-SCLC). However, there are active clinical trials evaluating the use of trilaciclib in other forms of cancer, including small cell lung cancer, breast cancer, and colorectal cancer.

5. Dalpiciclib is approved in China for use in combination with fulvestrant for treatment of HR-positive, HER2-negative recurrent, or metastatic breast cancer in patients who have progressed after previous endocrine therapy.

- Atirmociclib
- Zotiraciclib
- Milciclib
- Dinaciclib
- Seliciclib/Roscovitine
- Cirtociclib
- Tagtociclib
- Purvalanol A
  - Alvocidib/Flavopiridol

== In clinical trials ==
There are more than 10 CDK inhibitor compounds that have gone through or currently ongoing clinical trials, as of 2009. Most of them are targeting multiple CDKs, but some are targeting specific CDKs. For example, P1446A-05 targets CDK4. Various types of cancers including leukemia, melanoma, solid tumors, and other types are being targeted. In some cases, very specific cancer types, such as 'melanoma positive for cyclin D1 expression' are targeted to maximize the efficacy.

As of February 2017, trilaciclib (G1T28, CDK4/6 inhibitor, G1 Therapeutics) is in multiple phase II clinical trials. The drug is being tested as a method for reducing the adverse effects of chemotherapy. In August 2019, trilaciclib received breakthrough therapy designation for its ability to minimize chemotherapy-induced bone marrow suppression. As of August 2020, the drug was under Food and Drug Administration (FDA) priority review for small-cell lung cancer with an application decision date of February 15, 2021. Atirmociclib is an investigational CDK4-specific inhibitor being developed by Pfizer for the treatment of various solid tumors, particularly hormone receptor-positive, HER2-negative breast cancer.

Although CDK4/6 inhibitors have had the most success, CDK inhibitors targeting other CDKs are also undergoing clinical trials.

- Milciclib - a pan-CDK inhibitor targeting CDK1, CDK2, CDK4, and CDK7. It is currently being evaluated in phase II trials for hepatocellular carcinoma.
- Dinaciclib - a pan-CDK inhibitor against CDK1, CDK2, CDK5, and CDK9. As of December 2023, it is on the market as an orphan drug for treatment of chronic lymphocytic leukemia (CLL).
- Roscovitine - a pan-CDK inhibitor against CDK2, CDK7, CDK9. It is currently in phase II clinical trials for pituitary cushing disease.

=== Combination therapies ===
Due to recurrent issues with CDK inhibitor resistance and non-responders, the current focus of many clinical trials includes examining the outcomes of administering CDK inhibitors in combination with other existing therapies. The interest in combined therapies is also in part due to the fact that CDK inhibitors halt the cell cycle to stop cancer growth, but they do not induce apoptosis to reduce tumor size. Therefore, many clinical trials are interested in observing if there are better health outcomes by combining CDK inhibitors with other forms of therapy. For example, using a combination of Palbociclib (CDK4/6 inhibitor), Fulvestrant (estrogen receptor antagonist), and Avelumab (monoclonal antibody) for the treatment of metastatic ER+ HER- breast cancer is currently undergoing Phase II clinical trials.

== Other ==
- Purvalanol A, Olomoucine II.

Based on molecular docking results, Ligands-3, 5, 14, and 16 were screened among 17 different Pyrrolone-fused benzosuberene compounds as potent and specific inhibitors without any cross-reactivity against different CDK isoforms. Analysis of MD simulations and MM-PBSA studies, revealed the binding energy profiles of all the selected complexes. Selected ligands performed better than the experimental drug candidate (Roscovitine). Ligands-3 and 14 show specificity for CDK7 and Ligands-5 and 16 were specific against CDK9. These ligands are expected to possess lower risk of side effects due to their natural origin.

Interpretation of dynamic simulations and binding free energy studies unveiled that Ligand2 (Out of 17 in-house synthesized pyrrolone-fused benzosuberene (PBS) compounds) has a stable and equivalent free energy to Flavopiridol, SU9516, and CVT-313 inhibitors. Ligand2 scrutinized as a selective inhibitor of CDK2 without off-target binding (CDK1 and CDK9) based on ligand efficiency and binding affinity.

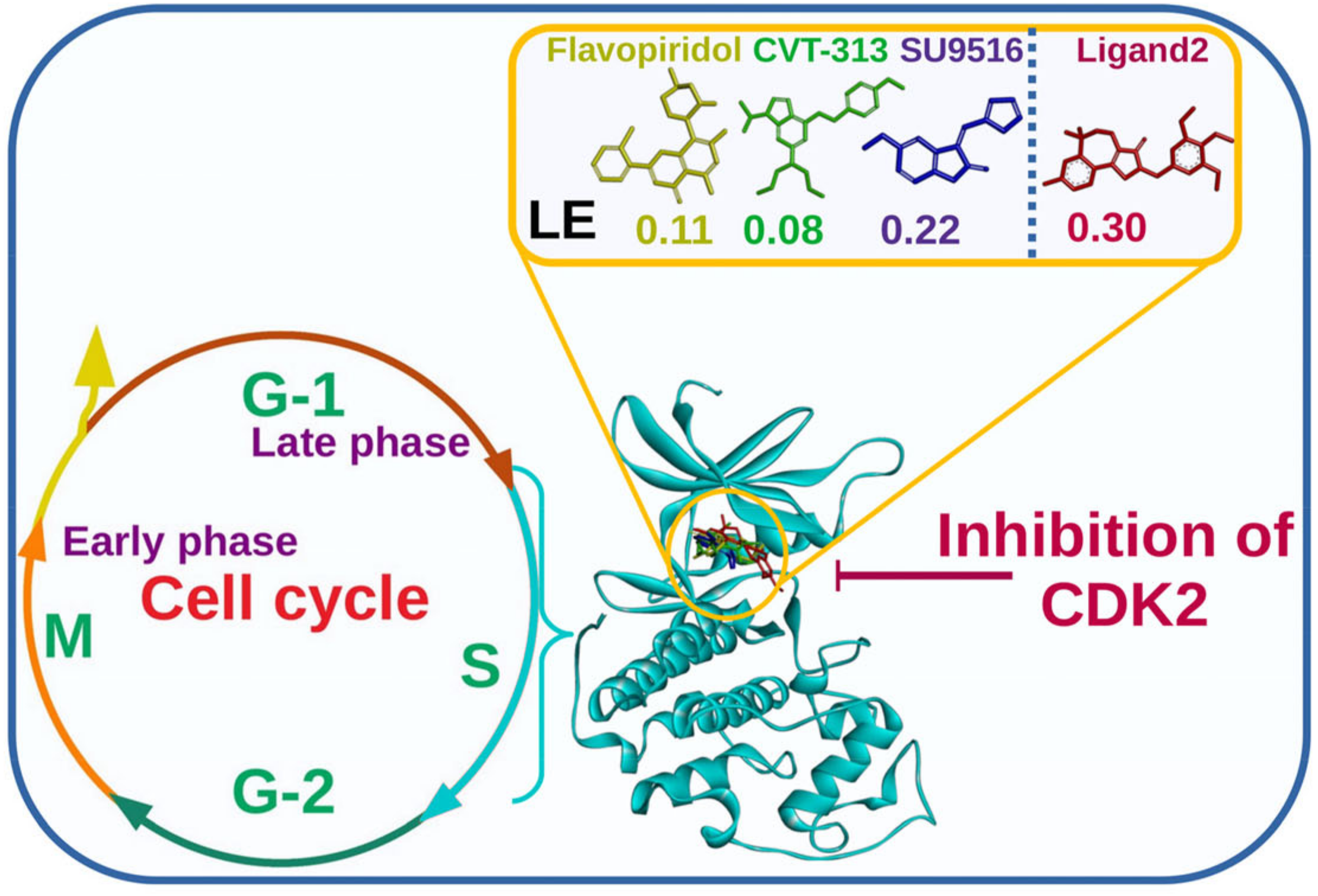
Graphical abstract of CDK2

== See also ==
- Cyclin-dependent kinase § Medical significance
- Zotiraciclib
- Atirmociclib
