= David Rees (organic chemist) =

British chemist (born 1958)

David Rees CBE FRS FRSC FMedSci
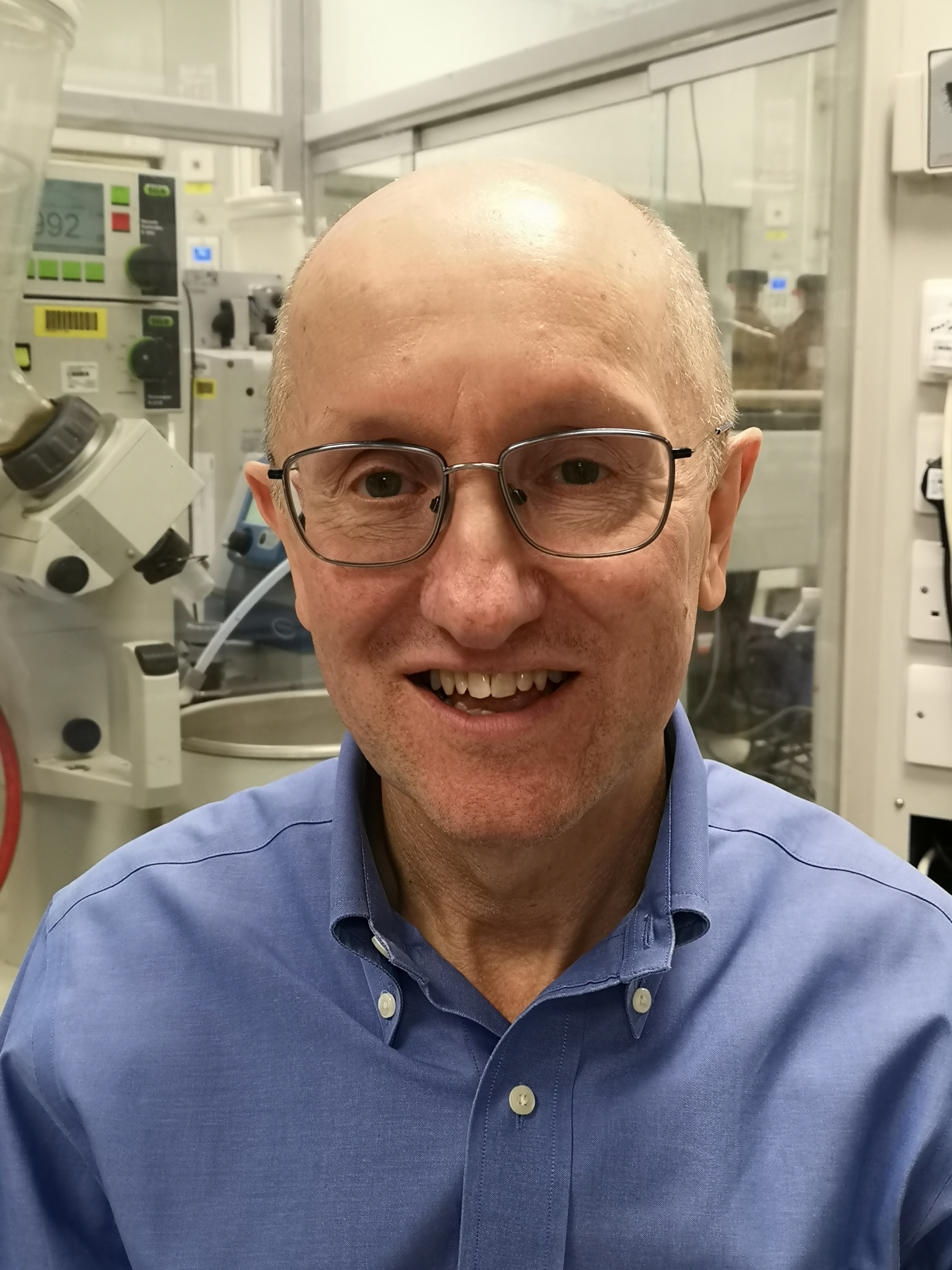
- Born: 1958 (age 67–68)
- Education: University of Southampton (BSc), University of Cambridge (PhD)
- Known for: Astex
- Awards: Royal Society of Chemistry, Malcolm Campbell Award 2007 Royal Society of Chemistry BMCS Hall of Fame 2020 Royal Society of Chemistry BMCS Lectureship 2021/2022 Fellowships Fellow of the Royal Society of Chemistry Fellow of the Academy of Medical Sciences (2020)
- Scientific career
- Fields: Drug discovery, Medicinal chemistry, Organic chemistry
- Workplaces: Astex, AstraZeneca, Organon
- Thesis: A new approach to the synthesis of aspidosperma alkaloids using tricarbonylcyclohexadienylium iron intermediates
- Website: astx.com/portfolio-item/david-rees

David Charles Rees CBE FRSC FMedSci (born 1958) is a chemist recognised internationally for his innovative use of chemistry in drug discovery. He was Chief Scientific Officer of biotechnology company Astex Pharmaceuticals, which is located in Cambridge, UK until his retirement in August 2025.

== Career ==
Rees joined Astex in 2003 to lead its chemistry team. He became Chief Scientific Officer (CSO) in 2017. In 2013, Astex was acquired for around USD $900 million and now operates as a wholly owned subsidiary of Otsuka Pharmaceutical Co. Ltd, headquartered in Tokyo, Japan.

Rees is associated with the discovery of three launched drugs: ribociclib (Astex-Novartis collaboration), erdafitinib (Astex-Janssen collaboration) as well as the anaesthetic reversal agent sugammadex (Organon, Merck), which has been used in over 30 million patients in 60 countries and had global sales of US$1.2 billion in 2020.

Rees has a BSc from the University of Southampton and PhD from the University of Cambridge.

== Fellowships, awards and academic appointments ==
Rees is a Fellow of the Royal Society of Chemistry (RSC). He is one of the few industrial scientists to have served as President of its Organic Division (2010-2013), and was later elected to the RSC Board of Trustees (2015-2019).

Rees has held visiting professorships at three UK universities, and sits on several scientific advisory boards for not-for-profit organisations. In 2020 he was elected as a Fellow of the Academy of Medical Sciences and inducted into the RSC BMCS Hall of Fame. He was elected a Fellow of the Royal Society in 2026. He has over 140 publications and patents.

Rees is also a Director of Ashanti Development, a charity that promotes clean water and sanitation in Ghana.
