= C25H30N6O2 =

The molecular formula C_{25}H_{30}N_{6}O_{2} may refer to:

- Dalpiciclib
- Erdafitinib
