= HSPB7 =

Protein found in humans

Identifiers
- Aliases: HSPB7, cvHSP, heat shock protein family B (small) member 7
- External IDs: OMIM: 610692; MGI: 1352494; GeneCards: HSPB7

Gene location (Mouse)
Chr.	Chromosome 4 (mouse)
Band	4|4 D3	Start	141,148,090 bp
Band	4|4 D3	End	141,152,622 bp
Gene ontology
Molecular function	filamin binding; protein C-terminus binding; protein binding
Cellular component	cytoplasm; aggresome; Cajal body; nucleus; nucleoplasm; actin cytoskeleton
Biological process	response to unfolded protein; regulation of heart contraction; development of the heart
Sources:Amigo / QuickGO
Orthologs
Databases	NCBI: entry; OMA: entry
Species	Human	Mouse
Entrez	27129	29818
Ensembl	ENSG00000173641	ENSMUSG00000006221
UniProt	Q9UBY9	P35385
RefSeq (mRNA)	NM_014424	NM_013868
RefSeq (protein)	NP_055239; NP_001336611; NP_001336612; NP_001336614; NP_001336615 NP_001336616; NP_001336617; NP_001336618	NP_038896
Location (UCSC)	n/a	Chr 4: 141.15 – 141.15 Mb
PubMed search
- Wikidata
View/Edit Human	View/Edit Mouse

Heat Shock Protein Family B (small) member 7 (HSPB7) in humans is a protein encoded by a gene of the same name with four exons that is located on chromosome 1p36.13.^{,}. HSPB7 contains 170 amino acids and has a molecular weight of 18,611 Da. HSPB7 is a member of human small heat shock protein (HSPB) family, which contains eleven family members of chaperone proteins. HSPB7 and its gene pair SRARP are located 5 kb apart on the opposite strands of chromosome 1p36.13.

== Expression and molecular function ==
HSPB7 is widely expressed throughout the body and its highest expression is observed in the cardiac tissue ^{,}. HSPB protein family, including HSPB7, act protectively on aggregation of several proteins containing an extended polyglutamine (polyQ) stretch that are linked to a variety of neurodegenerative diseases. Among these proteins, HSPB7 is the most potent polyQ aggregation suppressor within the HSPB family of chaperones. In addition, HSPB7 protein contains a HSP20 domain and strongly interacts with the chaperone protein 14-3-3. An interaction with the 14-3-3 protein is a common molecular feature between HSPB7 and SRARP proteins ^{,}

== Role in cardiomyopathy and Cancer ==
HSPB7 has cardiac protective functions and mutations in this gene leads to cardiomyopathies. It has been suggested that HSPB7 cardioprotective function is mediated by facilitating sarcomeric proteostasis. Furthermore, HSPB7 is widely inactivated in malignancies by copy-number loss and epigenetic silencing and the overexpression of this protein results in a tumor suppressor function in multiple cancer cell lines^{,}. The overexpression of HSPB7 and its gene pair SRARP lead to a reduction in the relative phosphorylation and/or expression of Akt and ERK in cancer cells. In addition, it has been suggested that HSBP7 is regulated by p53 tumor suppressor in renal cell carcinoma.

Approved Symbol	HSPB7
Approved Name	Heat shock protein family B (small) member 7
HGNC ID	HGNC:5249
Previous name	heat shock 27kD protein family, member 7 (cardiovascular)
Alias Symbols	cvHSP
Chromosome location	1p36.13
Ensembl	ENSG00000173641
UniProt	Q9UBY9
NCBI Gene	27129
RefSeq	NM_014424
UCSC	uc001axo.2
Protein Sequence	HSPB7 Protein Sequence (Ensembl)
Wikidata	Q18038659
PubMed	HSPB7 PubMed References
