= Metastatic breast cancer =

Type of spreading cancer

Common sites of metastasis for breast cancer

Metastatic breast cancer, also referred to as advanced breast cancer, secondary tumors, secondaries or stage IV breast cancer, is a stage of breast cancer in which malignant cells arising from breast tissue have spread to distant sites beyond the regional lymph nodes. Stage IV is the most advanced stage of breast cancer. Metastatic breast cancer cannot be cured, but it can be treated to enable women to live longer and to lessen symptoms.

Metastasis can occur several years after the primary breast cancer, although it is sometimes diagnosed at the same time as the primary breast cancer or, rarely, before the primary breast cancer has been diagnosed. A 2021 global metanalysis of over 400 studies suggests that between 6% and 22% of women with breast cancer develop metastases. From 6-10% of women have cancer that has already spread beyond the breast at the time of first diagnosis, referred to as de novo stage IV cancer.

Breast cancer metastases can appear anywhere in the body but most often spread to the bones, lungs, liver, and brain, with the most common site being bone. These distant metastases are the cause of most of the deaths due to breast cancer. Metastatic breast cancer cells frequently differ from the preceding primary breast cancer in ways that permit them to metastasize to distant sites, and may have developed resistance to previous types of treatment. However, they are still breast cancer cells, not bone cancer or lung cancer cells, and are treated as such.

Treatment of metastatic breast cancer depends on location of the metastatic tumors and can include chemotherapy, hormonal therapy. immunotherapy, radiation, and surgery. Subtypes of metastatic breast cancer are associated with varying patterns of occurrence, spread and prognosis. To help determine treatment, tumor biopsy samples are tested for biomarkers that affect cell growth. Tumors containing either estrogen receptors (ER) or progesterone receptors (PR) are called hormone receptor-positive (HR+) and can be treated with hormone therapies. Tumors that contain large amounts of the protein human epidermal growth factor receptor 2 (HER2) can be treated with HER2-targeted therapies. Tumors that do not contain ER, PR, or HER2 are called triple-negative tumors. Triple-negative tumors tend to grow more quickly than other breast cancer types.

== Secondary sites and symptoms ==
A diagnosis of metastatic breast cancer is given only when cancer cells have spread to distant sites, beyond the breast and the axillary lymph nodes. The most common distant sites to which breast cancer spreads are the bones, lungs, liver, and brain, but many other sites can also be involved. The symptoms produced by metastatic breast cancer vary by the location of the metastases.

- Metastatic disease to the bone occurs in roughly 70% of patients with advanced breast cancer. Bone metastasis can cause severe, progressive pain, and, less commonly, pathological fracture, spinal cord compression, and swelling.
- Metastatic disease to the liver occurs in roughly 50% of patients with advanced breast cancer. Incidence varies widely with subtype, and is reported at 25% for cases of triple-negative breast cancer and 32% for HER2-positive breast cancer. Liver metastasis causes jaundice, abdominal pain, loss of appetite, nausea, itchy skin, rash (sometimes due to treatments) and elevated liver enzymes.
- Metastatic breast cancer to the lung or pleura may occur in up to 50% of patients with advanced breast cancer. It can cause chronic cough, damage to the lungs and airways, shortness of breath, hemoptysis, pleural effusion, and chest pain. Frequent respiratory tract infection and associated inflammation may increase the risk of cancer cell activity in the lungs.
- Metastatic breast cancer to the brain is observed in 5–16% of all patients living with breast cancer. Incidence varies widely with subtype: incidence rates are reported at 5–10% for ER+/HER2-negative disease, 25–46% for patients with triple-negative breast cancer, and 30.7–53% for HER2-positive breast cancer. Brain metastasis can cause persistent, progressively worsening headache; changes in cognitive function; sensory or motor deficits (e.g. visual changes such as double vision, blurring vision, seeing flash of lights); seizures; behavioral and personality changes; nausea; vertigo; and increased intracranial pressure.
- Nonspecific systemic symptoms of metastatic breast cancer also include pain, fatigue, muscle weakness, fibromyalgia, weight loss, and poor appetite.
- Some people with metastatic breast cancer are asymptomatic and do not have any notable changes or symptoms.

It is also possible to have multiple primary malignancies, distinct cancers that have independent origins rather than being derived from breast cancer. This is rare, and differs from metastatic breast cancer: each primary cancer type will require its own specific treatment.

== Pathophysiology ==
=== Main steps ===
The spreading of a cancer from a primary to a secondary location is called a metastatic cascade. The main steps involved in a metastatic cascade are:

- Cell division and growth within the primary tumor
- Growing into, or invading, nearby normal tissue
- Moving through the walls of nearby lymph nodes or blood vessels (Intravasation of the circulatory system)
- Traveling through the lymphatic system and bloodstream to other parts of the body (Transit to a new environment)
- Stopping in small blood vessels at a distant location, invading the blood vessel walls, and moving into the surrounding tissue (Extravasation to a distant site)
- Growing in this tissue until a tiny tumor forms (Micrometastasis)
- Causing new blood vessels to grow, which creates a blood supply that allows the metastatic tumor to continue growing (Progressive colonization of the secondary tumor)

=== Factors affecting metastasis ===
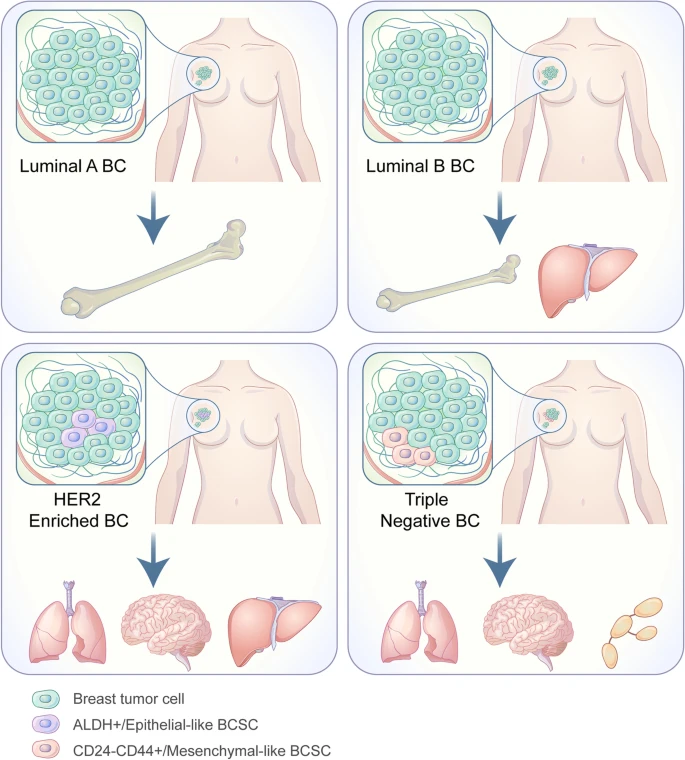
Molecular subtypes of breast cancer tend to develop secondary tumors in different organs.

The potential of a tumor cell to metastasize to a secondary site depends on the tissue microenvironment of the site and its suitability to be a "niche" for the tumor cell. The "seed and soil" hypothesis implies that specific organs ("soils") may be more likely to stimulate growth and harbor tumor cells from one type of cancer than from others ("seeds"). Interactions between tumor cells and organs may promote tumor-cell homing to a particular organ, cell invasion and metastasis. Interactions between cancer cells and their environment are dynamic and reciprocal, since cancer cells modify the environment they encounter. HR+ breast cancers tend to metastasize to bone (Luminal A) or to bone and liver (Luminal B), HER2 cancers to lung, brain and liver, and triple negative cancers to lung, brain and distant lymph nodes.

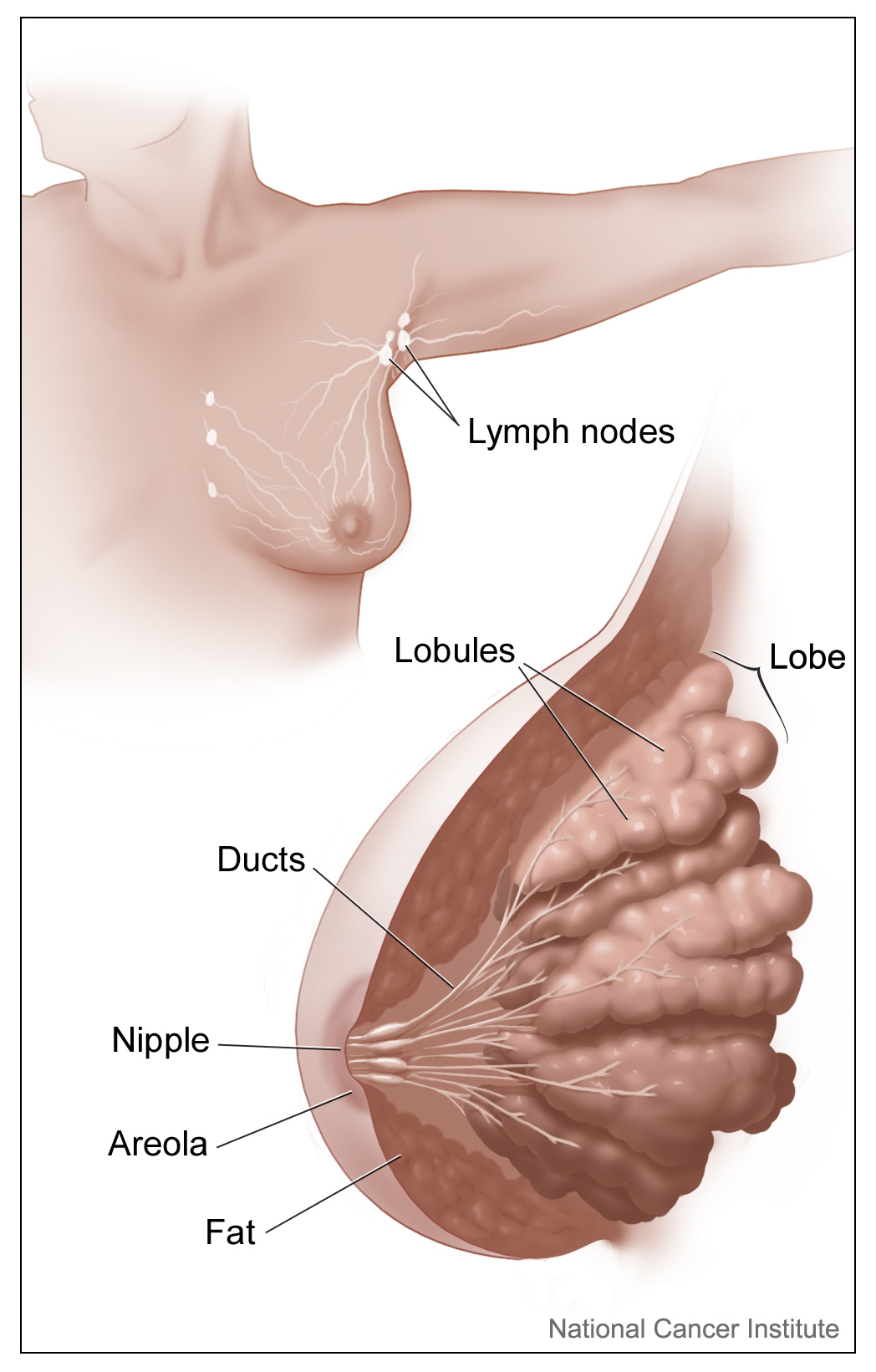
Healthy breast and nearby lymph nodes

The circulation of blood and lymph within the body is also a key element in the metastasis of tumor cells to secondary sites. Breast cancer cells may enter the circulation via the sentinel lymph node or via blood vessels from the primary tumor. A primary tumor requires oxygen and nutrients to survive. It secretes growth factors to stimulate formation of new blood vessels (angiogenesis). New blood vessels are crucial for sustaining the primary tumor, but also provide physical pathways for cancer cells to escape to other sites. Tumor-induced blood vessels tend to be leaky and fragile. Cancer cells can more easily penetrate them (vascular permeability), entering the bloodstream and traveling through it to reach other organs.

To survive the transit to a new environment, a tumor cell needs to pass through physical barriers such as the basement membranes of tissues, and evade chemical and biological protective mechanisms of cells and the innate and adaptive immune systems. The immune system actively works to monitor, recognize, and eliminate tumor cells, to maintain equilibrium and to prevent tumor cells from surviving and escaping.

The mobility of cancer cells can be affected by chemoattractants such as chemokines, with cells moving along a chemical gradient toward an attractant's source. This type of mechanism may enable cancer cells to find a favorable "niche".

Another mechanism involved in cancer metastasis is cell adhesion, the process by which cells attach to each other and their surroundings. This normally supports processes such as wound healing. The protein E-cadherin is important for formation and stability of attachments between cells (cell–cell adhesion), while integrin proteins affect the anchoring of cells to the extracellular matrix that surrounds cells (cell-ECM adhesion). The balance between E-cadherin and integrin is crucial to healthy cell development. Cancerous cells and cell clusters can alter adhesion signaling so that adhesion molecules help them to escape, invade new areas, "stick" to target tissue, and metastasize.

== Diagnosis ==
Diagnosis of metastatic breast cancer generally occurs after symptoms of secondary tumors have been reported. X-ray, ultrasound, or magnetic resonance imaging (MRI) may be used to detect suspicious areas of tissue. A biopsy will generally be done to determine whether tissue is benign or malignant. This can determine whether a secondary tumor contains breast cancer cells, and whether those cells differ from the original tumor.

Once a secondary tumor has been confirmed, CT scans or PET scans may be used to assess where and how far the tumor has spread. Bone scintigraphy (bone scan) is a leading technique for assessment of bone metastases.

Blood tests may also be done to look for tumor markers, proteins released by a tumor into the bloodstream. Tumor markers may be useful in assessing progression of a tumor or response to treatment. However, they are not considered conclusive evidence of either the presence or absence of a tumor. Additional blood tests may be done to assess whether organs in the body are functioning properly.

== Treatment ==
The focus of treatment in cases of metastatic breast cancer is to enable women to live longer and to lessen the impact of symptoms. While overall female breast cancer incidence rates in the United States have increased by between .5% and 1% per year since 2001, deaths from breast cancer have decreased by between 1.6% and 1.9% per year. Approximately one-third of women with metastatic breast cancer now live 5 years or more after diagnosis.

Metastasis is a complex and interconnected multi-step process. Treatments can target multiple steps in that process. When dealing with early-stage breast cancer, standard treatments tend to be breast-conserving surgery or mastectomy, often with radiotherapy. Chemotherapy may be used to reduce tumor volume before surgery, and systemic therapy may follow. Locally-focused surgery and radiotherapy are less useful once cancer has spread to distant areas. As a result, treatment of metastatic breast cancer tends to rely on systemic therapies which affect the whole body rather than a particular area. Systemic therapies include chemotherapy, hormone therapy, targeted-drug therapy and immunotherapy.

A treatment plan for metastatic breast cancer is individualized to a person based on factors such as:

- type of primary cancer and previous treatment
- size, location and number of secondary tumors
- biochemistry of tumor cells
- patient age, overall health, and symptoms
- treatment options and predicted effectiveness
- treatment risks and possible side effects

Systemic therapies target many different vulnerabilities of cancer cells. They may act on the genetic material that forms cancer cells, on hormone receptors and proteins on the surfaces of cancer cells, on proteins that control cell growth, and on signalling pathways that coordinate the growth and activity of cancer cells. Specific treatments may be recommended based on examination of breast cancer tissue samples to identify molecular subtypes of breast cancer with distinct clinical behaviors and therapeutic vulnerabilities. Tumors containing either estrogen receptor (ER) or progesterone receptor (PR) are called "hormone receptor-positive" and can be treated with hormone therapies. Tumors that contain large amounts of the protein human epidermal growth factor receptor 2 (HER2) can be treated with HER2-targeted therapies. Tumors that do not contain ER, PR, or HER2 are called "triple-negative" tumors. Some treatments specifically address triple-negative tumors.

Treatment may change over time, depending on how well the patient responds to a recommended treatment (no response, stable state, partial improvement, or disease free) and for how long. If a treatment is working and side effects are minimal, it may be continued. If a treatment is not working or side effects become hard to tolerate, a different treatment may be tried. Patient history, physical exams, followup scans and blood tests may all be used for longer-term monitoring through cycles of treatment, remission, and recurrence.

=== Chemotherapy ===
Chemotherapy is one of the most important components of therapy for metastatic breast cancer. It is a first-line therapy for cases that will not benefit from hormone therapy and a second-line therapy for those who no longer respond to hormone therapy. Chemotherapy drugs are cytotoxic and can affect normal cells as well as cancer cells. Some may cause unpleasant or dangerous side effects. One chemotherapy drug is usually given at a time. A number of chemotherapy drugs may be tried sequentially to determine one that works, or to replace ones that no longer work.

Chemotherapy drugs may be used for early stage breast cancer, metastatic breast cancer, or both. Classes of chemotherapy drugs that are commonly used to treat both early-stage and metastatic breast cancer include taxanes (docetaxel, paclitaxel, nab-paclitaxel), anthracyclines (doxorubicin, epirubicin), and antimetabolites (capecitabine). Platins (cisplatin, carboplatin, oxaliplatin) may be used to shrink early stage tumors and to treat metastatic breast cancer. Other drugs may be used as front-line therapy for metastatic breast cancer patients who cannot receive taxanes, anthracyclines, or capecitabine. Chemotherapy drugs that are used primarily for metastatic breast cancer include pegylated liposomal doxorubicin (an anthracycline), mitoxantrone (an antitumor antibiotic), gemcitabine (an antimetabolite), vinorelbine and eribulin (microtubule inhibitors), and ixabepilone (an epothilone).

Taxanes are frequently used as chemotherapy agents in treating metastatic breast cancer. Paclitaxel and docetaxel have FDA approval in the United States for breast cancer. They have different safety profiles, and require different steroid premedication before use. Nab-paclitaxel (Abraxane) has a lower risk of allergic reactions and does not require steroid premedication prior to use. Nab-paclitaxel is approved in the USA for patients with metastatic breast cancer who either relapsed within six months of adjuvant chemotherapy or failed to respond to combination chemotherapy. In women with metastatic breast cancer, taxane-containing chemotherapy regimens appear to improve patient survival and slow cancer progression. Taxanes are associated with increased risk of chemotherapy-induced peripheral neuropathy, myelosuppression, and hypersensitivity reaction. They may cause nausea and vomiting, which are managed with dietary modification and anti-nausea medications.

Anthracyclines are powerful antibiotics that interfere with cell growth, but they are associated with both short and long term adverse side events. Use of doxorubicin and epirubicin is controversial due to dose-dependent risks of damage to the heart and of secondary leukemia. Analogs like pegylated liposomal doxorubicin and mitoxantrone may be less cardiotoxic than doxorubicin. Other types of antibiotics are also being studied for possible antitumor activity.

Capecitabine is an orally administered antimetabolite that affects DNA and RNA activity and disrupts the repair and replication of cancer cells. This form of 5-fluorouracil converts to an active drug in the presence of enzymes from tumor tissues. It has a favorable safety profile and has been used as a first-line treatment in some cases and as a second-line treatment when metastatic cancer has proved resistant to prior cycles of treatment. Another antimetabolite, gemcitabine, has been used in combination with carboplatin for the treatment of metastatic triple-negative breast cancer.

Platinum-containing chemotherapy regimens (Platins) damage DNA and make it difficult for cancer cells to repair themselves. Platins include cisplatin, carboplatin, and oxaliplatin. In women with metastatic triple negative breast cancer, there may be a moderate survival benefit from platinum-based treatment. In women with metastatic breast cancer who do not have triple negative disease, there is little or no survival benefit, and increased toxicity is associated with platinum-based regimens.

Vinorelbine and eribulin are microtubule inhibitors that interfere with cell growth. Vinorelbine has been approved by the European Medicines Agency for the treatment of advanced breast cancer that does not respond to anthracyclines. In the United States, vinorelbine is not formally approved for treatment of metastatic breast cancer, but it has FDA approval for some lung cancers and is used off-label for metastatic breast cancer. Eribulin has been approved in the United States for the treatment of patients that have not responded to prior chemotherapy for metastatic disease. Ixabepilone is an epothilone that acts as a microtubule stabilizer. It has been approved in the United States both alone and in combination with capecitabine for treatment of cases of metastatic breast cancer that are resistant to anthracyclines and taxanes.

=== Hormone therapy ===
Hormonal therapies (also called endocrine therapies) are crucial for treating cancers whose growth is triggered by hormones. Hormone receptor-positive (HR+) cancers involve estrogen receptors (ER+) or progesterone receptors (PR+). Estrogen naturally circulates in the body. When it attaches to specific proteins on cells, called estrogen receptors, it can trigger cancer cells to divide and multiply. Progesterone expression is dependent on estrogen, and can modulate the activity of estrogen receptors. 70%-75% of all breast cancer patients are reported to have breast cancers with high rates of ER expression. HR+ cancers can be further divided into subtypes such as Luminal A (HR+/HER2-) and Luminal B (HR+/HER2- or HR+/HER2+).

Hormone therapies are only suitable for HR-positive (HR+) breast cancers and cannot affect HR-negative (HR-) breast cancers. Hormone therapies work either by blocking hormone receptors or by reducing circulating hormone levels. Selective estrogen receptor modulators (SERM) like tamoxifen and selective estrogen receptor degraders (SERD) like fulvestrant block estrogen by binding to estrogen receptors and preventing estrogen from attaching to cells. SERDs can also damage the estrogen receptors to reduce their number.

The first-line standard-of-care for most HR+ patients (unless thay are also HER2+, see below) is an anti-estrogen drug such as tamoxifen combined with a targeted therapy like a CDK4/6 inhibitor to interfere with cancer cell growth. Hormone therapies are used for both early-stage and metastatic treatment of HR+ cancer. They tend to be well-tolerated and may produce remission for several years. A hormone therapy will usually be continued as long as it is successful in stabilizing tumors and relieving symptoms.

The choice of treatments to reduce circulating hormone levels depends on whether a woman is pre- or postmenopausal. For women who are still menstruating, treatments can include medications such as goserelin or leuprolide to suppress ovarian function, surgical removal of the ovaries, or radiation to halt estrogen production. For postmenopausal women, aromatase inhibitors (AIs) such as letrozole or anastrozole can be used to lower estrogen levels.

Treatment with hormonal therapies such as tamoxifen can be continued for 5 to 10 years. However, around 30% of metastatic HR+ breast cancer patients develop endocrine resistance. Development of resistance may require new approaches or combinations of different types of treatments.

=== Targeted therapy ===
A variety of therapies have been developed to selectively target cancer cells while minimizing damage to healthy cells. Different approaches interfere with specific activities of genes, proteins, and receptors to disrupt the growth and survival of cancer cells. Classes of targeted therapy drugs include CDK4/6 inhibitors (for HR+/HER- breast cancers), PI3K/AKT/mTOR inhibitors, monoclonal antibodies and antibody-drug conjugates (for HER2+ cancer, HER2-low breast cancers, and triple-negative breast cancers), and PARP inhibitors (for HER2-negative metastatic breast cancer with BRCA1 or BRCA2 gene mutations).

==== CDK4/6 inhibitors ====
CDK4/6 inhibitors (CDK4/6i) block specific proteins (cyclin-dependent kinases 4 and 6) to prevent cancer cells from growing and dividing. CDK4/6 inhibitors like palbociclib, ribociclib, abemaciclib, dalpiciclib, and trilaciclib are used to treat HR+/HER- breast cancers, often in combination with endocrine therapy. Side effects may be dose-dependent. The most common is lowered white blood cell count, which may increase risk of infection. People taking CDK4/6is should be monitored for respiratory tract infections.

==== PI3K/AKT/mTOR inhibitors ====
PI3K/AKT/mTOR inhibitors block a signaling pathway that cancer cells use to grow, divide, and survive. In cancer, the PI3K/AKT/mTOR signaling network is frequently hyperactive, mutated or lacks regulation, resulting in tumor growth and resistance to therapies. Mutations in the PIK3CA gene can lead to hyperactivity and tumor growth. The mTOR inhibitor everolimus has been approved by the FDA. It may be used in combination with the aromatase inhibitor exemestane. The PI3K inhibitor alpelisib and the AKT inhibitor capivasertib have also received approval as targeted therapies for HR+ metastatic breast cancer.

==== Monoclonal antibodies ====
HER2-positive breast cancer (HER+) cells contain large amounts of the protein human epidermal growth factor receptor 2 (HER2). They can be treated with HER2-targeted therapies. For metastatic HER2-positive breast cancer, anti-HER2 therapy is recommended as early as possible. Monoclonal antibodies like trastuzumab and pertuzumab identify and bind to cancer cells. The combination regiment of trastuzumab and pertuzumab with the chemotherapy agent docetaxel is a recommended first-line standard of treatment for HER2+ cancer. The tyrosine kinase inhibitor Lapatinib is an approved second-line treatment for metastatic HER2+ breast cancer.

==== Antibody-drug conjugates ====
Antibody-drug conjugates (ADCs) combines a monoclonal antibody that identifies and binds to cancer cells with a chemotherapy drug that attacks cancer cells. The antibody and the drug are linked together. The chemotherapy drug remains inactive while the ADC circulates in the bloodstream. The monoclonal antibody finds specific proteins on the surface of a target cancer cell and binds to them. Once inside the cell, the linkers that inactivated the chemotherapy drug are broken down by enzymes in the cell. This releases the chemotherapy drug payload directly into the cancer cell.

The antibody-drug conjugate Trastuzumab emtansine (Kadcyla) links the monoclonal antibody trastuzumab with the chemotherapy drug emtansine. Kadcyla targets cancerous cells and releases its payload in response to a protein found in HER2+ breast cancer cells. This target therapy method has extremely low side effects. Trastuzumab deruxtecan (Enhertu) links trastuzumab with the chemotherapy drug deruxtecan. This targeted antibody-drug conjugate is used to treat HER2-low breast cancers (which contain low but non-zero levels of HER2) as well as metastatic HER2-positive breast cancers.

Tumors that do not contain ER, PR, or HER2 are called triple-negative breast cancers (TNBC). The antibody-drug conjugate sacituzumab govitecan (Trodelvy) can be used to treat triple-negative breast cancer. It targets the cell surface receptor trophoblast cell-surface antigen 2 (TROP-2) which is overexpressed in approximately 80% of breast cancers. Sacituzumab govitecan has been identified as the most effective second-line treatment option for patients with metastatic triple-negative breast cancer who fail to respond to initial chemotherapy.

==== PARP inhibitors ====
PARP inhibitors are targeted therapies for HER2-negative metastatic breast cancer in patients with inherited BRCA1 or BRCA2 gene mutations. These cancer cells already have difficult repairing themselves. PARP inhibitors such as olaparib (Lynparza) and talazoparib (Talzenna) block PARP enzymes and prevent cancer cells from repairing themselves.

=== Immunotherapy ===
Immune cell signaling and immune regulation are involved in at least one subtype of triple-negative breast cancer (TNBC). PD-1 and PD-L1 are immune checkpoint proteins that can turn immune responses on or off. Cancer cells manipulate the PD-1/PD-L1 pathway to suppress immune responses and escape detection by immune cells. Immune checkpoint inhibitors (ICIs) and monoclonal antibodies (mAbs) are therapies that modify PD-1/PD-L1 activity so that the immune system attacks cancer cells instead of ignoring them. Atezolizumab (a PD-L1 inhibitor) and pembrolizumab (a PD-1 inhibitor) combined with chemotherapy are FDA-approved first-line treatments for PD-L1 positive metastatic TNBC.

Research suggests that cycling regulatory T cells (cycTreg) may act as another checkpoint inhibitor, enabling cancer cells to escape the immune system and tumors to transition from preinvasive to invasive breast cancer. T cells are a primary immune system defense against cancer. Their frequency and composition in human breast tissue vary with tumor progression and subtype. The presence of cycTreg is associated with weakened T cells, lowered immune activity and more aggressive disease. Potential treatments could target PD-L1, OX40 and single-agent αIL-33 in order to reduce cycTreg frequency and protect immune activity.

=== Radiotherapy ===
In the treatment of metastatic breast cancer, radiotherapy has traditionally been used as a palliative treatment to control tumor progression and suppress tumor related symptoms. The most common reasons for a patient with metastatic breast carcinoma to be treated with radiotherapy are:

- Spinal cord compression. In breast cancer, spinal-cord compression occurs when a bone metastasis or spinal metastasis begins to push on the spinal cord, resulting in inflammation and, if untreated, serious injury. Radiotherapy is an important component of therapy for cord compression secondary to metastatic breast cancer, along with corticosteroids and surgery.
- Liver metastases. Typically, pain from liver metastases responds to chemotherapy and analgesia. However, in cases when chemotherapy is contraindicated, liver metastases are refractory to chemotherapy, and pain medication fails, radiotherapy should be considered to relieve pain and shrink the metastases.
- Brain metastases. Brain metastases occur in up to 10–15% of breast-cancer patients, often late in the disease. They require urgent treatment; brain metastases may progress rapidly, and can produce life-threatening complications such as increased intracranial pressure, herniation of the brain, and seizures. Radiotherapy is essential in the treatment of brain metastases from breast cancer, as it halts tumor progression quickly and can induce a response in the majority of patients.
- Bone metastases. The bones are a very common site of metastatic disease from breast cancer, and bone metastases can cause severe pain, hypercalcemia and pathologic fracture. Radiotherapy is indicated to prevent pathologic fracture; it is also part of postoperative treatment following repair of a pathologic fracture. Radiopharmaceuticals such as Strontium-89 chloride, which is injected into the bloodstream, have been used for the treatment of pain related to bone metastases from breast cancer.

=== Surgery ===
Once cancer has spread to distant areas, treatment tends to rely on therapies that affect the whole body rather than locally-focused surgery. Surgery may be used for specific issues such as spinal cord compression. A 2025 Cochrane review suggests that adding surgery for de novo metastatic breast cancer (stage IV cancer that has already spread beyond the breast at first diagnosis) may improve local disease control.

=== "Alternative" and "complementary" therapies ===
Yale Medicine recommends that patients work with their doctors and openly discuss possible effects of any treatment they are considering. Alternative and complementary therapies are not regulated by the U.S. federal government and may lack quality controls.

There is no evidence that any alternative treatments can treat cancer. There is evidence that complementary therapies may help to alleviate symptoms and improve quality of life when integrated into a medical treatment plan. However, they do not treat the cancer itself. Patients who rely on alternative or complementary therapies and refuse or delay conventional cancer treatments are more likely to die.

==== "Alternative" therapies ====
Some patients with metastatic breast cancer opt to try alternative therapies that are claimed to achieve healing effects similar to scientifically-tested medical approaches, but lack scientific evidence to support those claims. Approaches that are considered alternative therapies when applied to cancer treatment include vitamin therapies, homeopathic treatments, extreme diets, chiropractic treatment and acupuncture.

Some alternative treatments are harmful or even life-threatening. Amygdalin, an extract derived from apricot kernels, exposes the patient to cyanide. Bee venom can cause a life-threatening allergic reaction. Severe dietary restrictions such as macrobiotic diets can disrupt the body's metabolism and cause dangerous weight loss. Dieting, vitamins, and other alternative treatments may interfere with the effectiveness of surgery, chemotherapy or radiation.

==== "Complementary" therapies ====
While they do not treat the cancer itself, there are evidence-based treatments that may help to alleviate symptoms and improve quality of life for patients, when integrated into a broader medical treatment plan. These are sometimes referred to as "complementary" or "integrative" therapies.

For example, patients may find hypnosis, massage, meditation, relaxation techniques, tai chi or yoga to be helpful for issues such as stress, pain, nausea, and difficulty sleeping. Gentle exercise and a healthy diet can contribute to overall well-being and quality of life. Some early research suggests that women who refrain from eating for at least 13 hours overnight are less likely to have a cancer recurrence, possibly due to differences in insulin, ketone or glucose metabolism. As yet, the effects of nutrition and exercise on cancers are not well understood and some theories are controversial.

However, patients have been shown to face a greater risk of mortality if they refuse or delay scientifically-proven treatments in favor of alternative therapies. This is also true in the case of complementary therapies. A study published in JAMA Oncology compared the survival of those who used complementary cancer treatments and those who used only the medical cancer treatments recommended by their doctors. They found that those who used complementary treatments during cancer treatment were more likely to refuse some of the conventional cancer treatments their doctors recommended, resulting in a higher risk of dying as compared to those who used no complementary treatments at all. Those most likely to choose complementary treatments were young, affluent, well-educated women with private insurance.

"Complementary medicine can be quite useful when used in addition to all physician-prescribed cancer therapies," says Dr. Park. "However, what is harmful is when patients believe that they can use it to replace surgery, radiation therapy, chemotherapy, hormonal therapy, or immunotherapy, or if it is used without the knowledge of their cancer physicians."

== See also ==
- breast cancer
- metastasis
- neoplasm
- chemotherapy
- Mouse models of breast cancer metastasis
- Phyllodes tumour
