= Zotiraciclib =

Chemical compound

Clinical data
- Other names: TG02, SB1317
- Routes of administration: By mouth
- ATC code: None

Legal status
- Legal status: Investigational

Pharmacokinetic data
- Protein binding: >99%
- Metabolism: CYP3A4, CYP1A2

Identifiers
- IUPAC name: (16Z)-14-Methyl-20-oxa-5,7,14,27-tetraazatetracyclo[19.3.1.1^{2,6}.1^{8,12}]heptacosa-1(25),2(27),3,5,8(26),9,11,16,21,23-decaene
- CAS Number: 1204918-72-8
- PubChem CID: 16739650
- ChemSpider: 30689952
- UNII: 40D08182TT
- KEGG: D11599
- ChEMBL: ChEMBL1944698
- CompTox Dashboard (EPA): DTXSID601337151

Chemical and physical data
- Formula: C_{23}H_{24}N_{4}O
- Molar mass: 372.472 g·mol^{−1}
- 3D model (JSmol): Interactive image
- SMILES: CN1C/C=C\CCOc2cccc(c2)-c3ccnc(n3)Nc4cccc(c4)C1
- InChI: InChI=1S/C23H24N4O/c1-27-13-3-2-4-14-28-21-10-6-8-19(16-21)22-11-12-24-23(26-22)25-20-9-5-7-18(15-20)17-27/h2-3,5-12,15-16H,4,13-14,17H2,1H3,(H,24,25,26)/b3-2-; Key:VXBAJLGYBMTJCY-IHWYPQMZSA-N

Zotiraciclib (TG02) is a potent oral spectrum selective kinase inhibitor for the treatment of cancer. It was discovered in Singapore by S*BIO Pte Ltd and falls under the category of small molecule macrocycles. It crosses the blood brain barrier and acts by depleting Myc through the inhibition of cyclin-dependent kinase 9 (CDK9). It is one of a number of CDK inhibitors under investigation; others targeting CDK9 for the treatment of acute myeloid leukemia include alvocidib and atuveciclib. Myc overexpression is a known factor in many cancers, with 80 percent of glioblastomas characterized by this property. Zotiraciclib has been granted orphan drug designation by the US Food and Drug Administration (FDA) and the European Medicines Agency (EMA) for the treatment of gliomas.

As of January 2020, zotiraciclib is being evaluated by Adastra Pharmaceuticals in two separate Phase 1b clinical trials for the treatment of glioblastoma multiforme (GBM). Zotiracicib is also being developed as a potential treatment for diffuse intrinsic pontine glioma (DIPG), a rare pediatric cancer. Both forms of brain cancer are characterized by Myc overexpression.

== Development ==
The first Phase 1b clinical trial of zotiraciclib in GBM, sponsored by the National Cancer Institute (NCI), is a multi-arm, dose-finding study examining zotiraciclib plus dose-dense or metronomic temozolomide (TMZ) in adults with recurrent anaplastic astrocytoma and GBM.

Zotiraciclib is also being explored for the treatment of DIPG, a rare pediatric cancer.
