= Sapacitabine =

Chemical compound

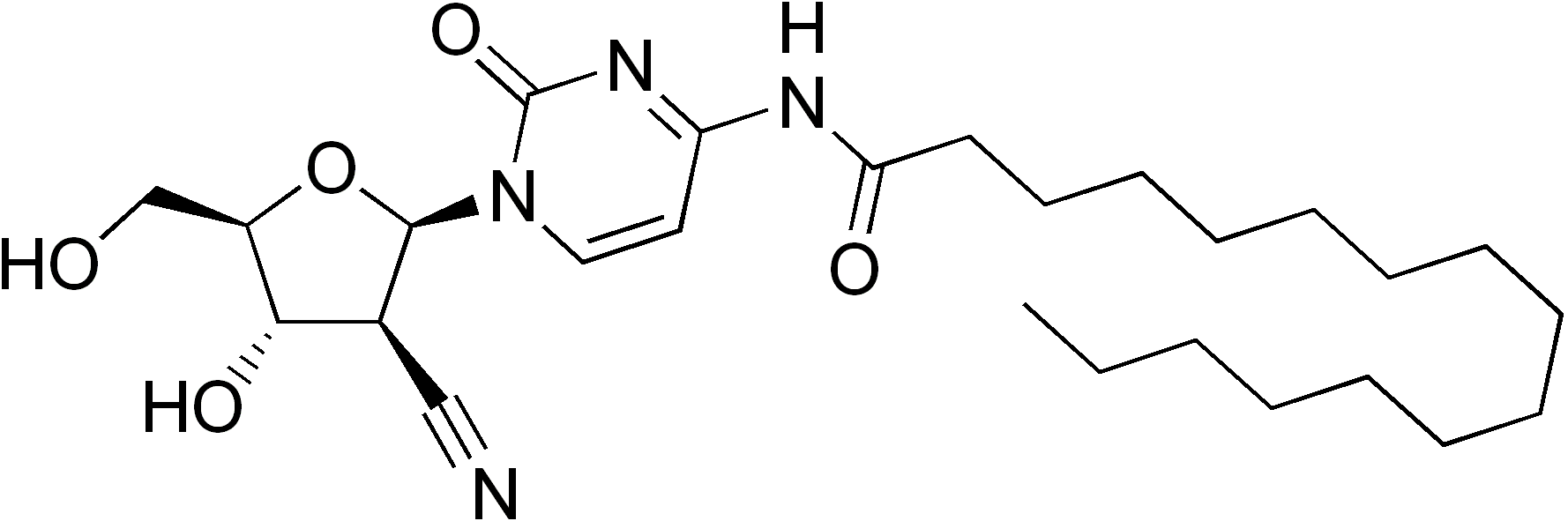

Clinical data
- Other names: N-[1-[(2R,3S,4S,5R)-3-Cyano-4-hydroxy-5-(hydroxymethyl)oxolan-2-yl]-2-oxopyrimidin-4-yl]hexadecanamide
- ATC code: none

Identifiers
- IUPAC name: 1-(2-cyano-2-deoxy-β-D-arabinofuranosyl)-4-(palmitoylamino)pyrimidin-2(1H)-one
- CAS Number: 151823-14-2
- PubChem CID: 153970
- ChemSpider: 135703
- UNII: W335P73C3L
- KEGG: D09722
- ChEBI: CHEBI:145429
- CompTox Dashboard (EPA): DTXSID90164887

Chemical and physical data
- Formula: C_{26}H_{42}N_{4}O_{5}
- Molar mass: 490.645 g·mol^{−1}
- 3D model (JSmol): Interactive image
- SMILES: CCCCCCCCCCCCCCCC(=O)NC1=NC(=O)N(C=C1)[C@H]2[C@H]([C@@H]([C@H](O2)CO)O)C#N
- InChI: InChI=1S/C26H42N4O5/c1-2-3-4-5-6-7-8-9-10-11-12-13-14-15-23(32)28-22-16-17-30(26(34)29-22)25-20(18-27)24(33)21(19-31)35-25/h16-17,20-21,24-25,31,33H,2-15,19H2,1H3,(H,28,29,32,34)/t20-,21+,24-,25+/m0/s1; Key:LBGFKUUHOPIEMA-PEARBKPGSA-N

Sapacitabine is a chemotherapeutic drug developed by US biotechnology firm Cyclacel currently undergoing clinical trials against leukemia.

Sapacitabine is an orally available nucleoside analog prodrug of 2′-C-cyano-2′-deoxy-1-β-D-arabino-pentofuranosyl-cytosine (CNDAC) that acts through a dual mechanism. CNDAC lasts longer in the bloodstream by being metabolized from sapacitibine than it would do so by being directly administered.

The compound interferes with DNA synthesis by causing single-strand DNA breaks due to CNDAC being incorporated into DNA during replication or repair, then inducing arrest of the cell division cycle at G2 phase.

Both sapacitabine and its major metabolite, CNDAC, have demonstrated potent anti-tumor activity in both blood and solid tumors in preclinical studies. In a liver metastatic mouse model, sapacitabine was shown to be superior to gemcitabine or 5-FU, two widely used nucleoside analogs, in delaying the onset and growth of liver metastasis.

== Clinical trials ==
Cyclacel has initiated a number of clinical trials to evaluate sapacitabine in both solid and hematological tumors laying the foundation for future Phase II studies and combination studies with other anti-cancer agents. Three Phase I clinical trial studies have been completed, which evaluated the safety and pharmacokinetics of a variety of dosing schedules in approximately 120 patients with solid tumors.

Sapacitabine is being evaluated as of March 2016 in three different studies; a Phase III trial for elderly patients with AML (acute myeloid leukemia), a Phase II trial for MDS (myelodysplastic syndromes), and a Phase I trial in combination with seliciclib for cancer treatment including hereditary ovarian and breast cancers. Thus far approximately 1,000 patients have received sapacitibine treatment in all phases of trials.

An ongoing Phase III clinical trial, SEAMLESS, has 485 enrolled members and is open to elderly (70+ years of age) AML (acute myeloid leukemia) patients with good renal and liver function and who are not viable candidates for or have refused intensive induction chemotherapy. SEAMLESS is a global study with 118 different sites in the United States, Austria, Belgium, France, Germany, Hungary, Italy, Poland, Spain, Sweden, Switzerland, and the United Kingdom. In the trial an arm of oral sapacitibine is given in alternating cycles with IV decitabine, which is compared to the control arm of IV decitabine alone. The SEAMLESS study was constructed based on the promising results of a Phase II one-year survival study for patients with AML. The efficacy goal of the treatment is overall survival; the average survival of an elderly person diagnosed with AML is approximately three to six months. The Data Safety Monitoring Board has communicated the unlikelihood that this Phase III study will reach a statistically significant survival improvement due to the planned futility boundary of 247 patient deaths already being crossed, but the trial is ongoing. During a poster session at the 2012 American Society of Hematology, results from a Phase I/II clinical trial studying the safety and efficacy of the oral sapacitibine along with IV decitabine were presented, selected data highlights are as follows: median overall survival was approximately 8 months, patients still alive at 3 months was 83%, 35% of patients survived a year or longer, 2 dose-limiting toxicities in the form of lung infection and typhlitis were observed.

For the Phase II trial for MDS patients so far, median survival overall was about 9.7 months, with the average median survival overall for patients receiving classic azacitidine or decitabine is approximately 4.3-5.9 months. More data will be arriving from the second half of this trial meant to allow better dosing regimens.

The Phase II study for sapacitibine with seliciclib in advanced cancer patients is ongoing; so far, "durable partial responses" and "prolonged stable disease" have been seen particularly for patients with the BRCA mutations. In a group of 45 patients including those with breast, ovarian, and pancreatic cancers, a "35.6% disease control rate was observed."

== Commercial Aspects and Intellectual Property ==
As of August 2016, Cyclacel had a 19.5 million dollar market capitalization and shares of the company have declined in value recently due to research and development costs of 2.6 million dollars and general and administrative expense costs of 1.3 million dollars. Cyclacel ended the last quarter in 2016 with 15.9 million dollars in cash and equivalents. An earnings report from H.C. Wainwright & Co. acknowledged how Cyclacel may at first seem like an unattractive investment but the ultimate risk/reward opportunity may be positive; sapacitibine has indeed shown very positive anti-tumor activity and has progressed to Phase III clinical trials for elderly patients with AML.

Cyclacel holds worldwide right to commercialize sapacitibine, except in Japan for which Daiichi Sankyo "has a right of first negotiation". They currently have essentially all marketing rights globally for the compounds in association with their drug development programs. Numerous patents from Cyclacel are found related to sapacitibine and sapacitibine dosing regimes along with other drugs such as decitibine. There are patents and applications that no longer apply to current use of sapacitibine, some involving administration of sapacitibine and seliciclib.

Cyclacel currently has no sales or marketing capability and so will rely on alliances to distribute and commercialize the various drugs they hope to bring through the development pipeline. These compounds particularly target control of the cell cycle for treating cancer and other diseases.

Cyclacel says current funds and generated money from items such as R&D tax credits and "recent financing activities" will carry them through 2017. The European Medicines Agency (EMA) and the U.S. Food and Drug Administration (FDA) have granted orphan drug status to sapacitibine for the treatment of AML and MDS; this designation assists in funding and provides various benefits for the drug's development such as market exclusivity for a period of several years, grant funding, tax credits, and potential fee waivers.
