= Dalpiciclib =

Chemical compound

Clinical data
- Other names: SHR6390

Identifiers
- IUPAC name: 6-Acetyl-8-cyclopentyl-5-methyl-2-[(5-piperidin-4-ylpyridin-2-yl)amino]pyrido[2,3-d]pyrimidin-7-one
- CAS Number: 1637781-04-4
- PubChem CID: 86279927
- IUPHAR/BPS: 11189
- DrugBank: DB17456
- ChemSpider: 114951729
- UNII: 5ZHA5P4PFX
- ChEMBL: ChEMBL4802161

Chemical and physical data
- Formula: C_{25}H_{30}N_{6}O_{2}
- Molar mass: 446.555 g·mol^{−1}
- 3D model (JSmol): Interactive image
- SMILES: CC1=C(C(=O)N(C2=NC(=NC=C12)NC3=NC=C(C=C3)C4CCNCC4)C5CCCC5)C(=O)C
- InChI: InChI=1S/C25H30N6O2/c1-15-20-14-28-25(29-21-8-7-18(13-27-21)17-9-11-26-12-10-17)30-23(20)31(19-5-3-4-6-19)24(33)22(15)16(2)32/h7-8,13-14,17,19,26H,3-6,9-12H2,1-2H3,(H,27,28,29,30); Key:SGJLSPUSUBJWHO-UHFFFAOYSA-N

Dalpiciclib is a drug for the treatment of various forms of cancer.

In China, dalpiciclib is approved for use in combination with fulvestrant for treatment of HR-positive, HER2-negative recurrent, or metastatic breast cancer in patients who have progressed after previous endocrine therapy.

Dalpicicilib is a CDK inhibitor that targets the CDK4 and CDK6 isoforms.
