= Cyclacel =

American pharmaceutical company

Cyclacel Pharmaceuticals, Inc.
- Company type: Public
- Traded as: Nasdaq: CYCC
- Industry: Biotechnology
- Founded: 1997
- Headquarters: Berkeley Heights, New Jersey, U.S.
- Key people: Spiro Rombotis, CEO; David P. Lane, founder
- Products: Seliciclib (CYC202), Sapacitabine (CYC682), Aurora kinase inhibitors (CYC116)
- Net income: ▼US$ 19.7 million (2010)
- Number of employees: 18 (2011)
- Website: http://www.cyclacel.com

Cyclacel Pharmaceuticals Inc. is a biotechnology firm based in Dundee, Scotland, and Short Hills, New Jersey, developing cancer drugs and treatments. Cyclacel was founded in 1996 by David Lane, Merlin Ventures and Cancer Research Campaign Technology with the University of Dundee and the University of Glasgow.

== Company overview ==
Cyclacel Pharmaceuticals, Inc. is a biopharmaceutical company developing oral therapies that target the various phases of cell cycle control for the treatment of cancer and other serious diseases. Sir David Lane, a recognized leader in the field of tumor suppressor biology, who discovered the p53 protein, founded the company in 1996. In 1999, Cyclacel Pharmaceuticals was joined by David Glover, a recognized leader in the mechanism of mitosis or cell division, who discovered, among other cell cycle targets, the mitotic kinases, Polo and Aurora, enzymes that act in the mitosis phase of the cell cycle.

Three product candidates are currently in clinical development. Sapacitabine (CYC682), a cell cycle modulating nucleoside analogue, failed its Phase 3 trial for the treatment of acute myeloid leukemia (AML) in the elderly. Phase 1/2 studies are ongoing for the treatment of breast cancer and AML/MDS. Seliciclib (CYC202 or R-roscovitine), a CDK (cyclin dependent kinase) inhibitor, is in Phase 2 studies for the treatment of lung cancer and nasopharyngeal cancer and in a Phase 1 trial in combination with sapacitabine. CYC116, an Aurora kinase and VEGFR2 inhibitor, is in a Phase 1 trial in patients with solid tumors.

Cyclacel Pharmaceuticals' ALIGN Pharmaceuticals subsidiary markets directly in the U.S. Xclair Cream for radiation dermatitis, Numoisyn® Liquid and Numoisyn® Lozenges for xerostomia.

=== Reverse merger ===
After becoming the first European spin-out company to raise over $100 million in private equity, the company had to pull out of a stock market listing in July 2004. Cyclacel completed a reverse merger with Xcyte Therapies in December 2005 to acquire Nasdaq listing. This allowed Cyclacel to raise an additional $45 million in April 2006 through a private placement of stock and warrants.

== See also ==
- Pharmaceutical industry in the United Kingdom
