= Harren Jhoti =

British structural biologist (born 1962)

Harren Jhoti OBE FRS FMedSci FRSB FRSC
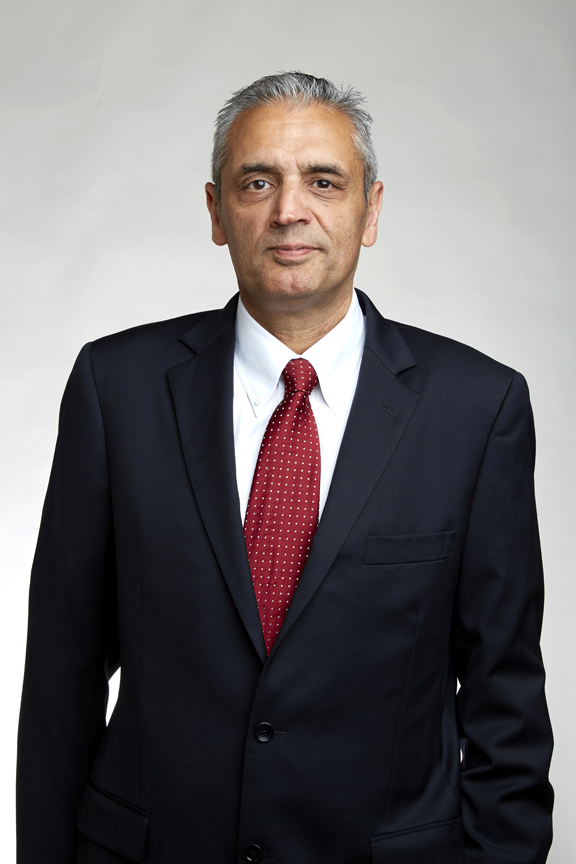
- Born: 1962 (age 63–64); India
- Education: Queen Mary College, University of London (BSc); Birkbeck College (MSc, PhD)
- Known for: Astex Pharmaceuticals
- Awards: UK BioIndustry Association (BIA) Lifetime Achievement Award (2018); European Federation for Medicinal Chemistry Prous Institute-Overton and Meyer Award for New Technologies in Drug Discovery (2012); Royal Society of Chemistry Entrepreneur of the Year (2007)
- Scientific career
- Fields: Drug discovery Structural biology
- Workplaces: Astex GlaxoWellcome University of Oxford
- Thesis: X-ray structural studies on transferrins (1989)
- Website: astx.com/portfolio-item/harren-jhoti/

Harren Jhoti (born 1962) is an Indian-born British structural biologist whose main interest has been rational drug design and discovery. He was president and chief executive officer (CEO) of biotechnology company Astex Pharmaceuticals ("Astex") which is located in Cambridge, United Kingdom until he left his position at the end of September 2025.

== Career ==
Jhoti co-founded Astex with Tom Blundell and Chris Abell in 1999. He pioneered the development of fragment-based drug discovery (FBDD), an approach now widely used in industry and academia, which identifies small molecules with potential therapeutic potential as part of the drug discovery process. Jhoti was Astex's chief scientific officer until November 2007 when he was appointed CEO. In 2013, Astex was acquired for around US$900 million and now operates as a wholly owned subsidiary of Otsuka Pharmaceutical Co. Ltd, headquartered in Tokyo, Japan.

Prior to Astex, Jhoti was head of structural biology at GlaxoWellcome (now GSK). Before founding Astex in 1999, he was head of structural biology and bioinformatics at GlaxoWellcome in the UK (1991-1999). Prior to GlaxoWellcome, Jhoti was a post-doctoral scientist at the University of Oxford.

Jhoti received both his BSc (Hons) in biochemistry in 1985 and PhD in protein crystallography in 1989 from the University of London.

== Honours, fellowships and awards ==
Jhoti's scientific achievements have been recognised by the Royal Society, the Royal Society of Chemistry, the Royal Society of Biology and the Academy of Medical Sciences. He has also received the UK BioIndustry Association (BIA)'s Lifetime Achievement Award (2018) and the European Federation for Medicinal Chemistry's Prous Institute-Overton and Meyer Award for New Technologies in Drug Discovery (2012). Jhoti has previously been recognised as the Royal Society of Chemistry's Entrepreneur of the Year Entrepreneur of the Year (2007). He has also served on the board of the BIA between 2013 and 2015.

Jhoti has been published in Nature and Science, and was featured in Time magazine after Astex was named a Technology Pioneer by the World Economic Forum in 2005.

Jhoti was appointed Officer of the Order of the British Empire (OBE) in the 2023 New Year Honours for services to cancer research and drug discovery.
