= SRARP =

Protein found in humans

Identifiers
- Aliases: SRARP, ERRF, C1orf64, chromosome 1 open reading frame 64, steroid receptor associated and regulated protein
- External IDs: MGI: 2685540; GeneCards: SRARP

Gene location (Human)
Chr.	Chromosome 1 (human)
Band	1p36.13	Start	16,004,236 bp
Band	1p36.13	End	16,008,807 bp

Gene location (Mouse)
Chr.	Chromosome 4 (mouse)
Band	4|4 D3	Start	141,159,983 bp
Band	4|4 D3	End	141,163,416 bp
RNA expression pattern
Bgee	Human / Mouse (ortholog); Top expressed in: internal globus pallidus; substantia nigra; inferior ganglion of vagus nerve; ventral tegmental area; lateral nuclear group of thalamus; subthalamic nucleus; putamen; C1 segment; cerebellar vermis; postcentral gyrus / Top expressed in: embryo; blastocyst; morula; trigeminal ganglion; striatum of neuraxis; olfactory bulb; cerebellum; Cortex of frontal lobe; primary visual cortex; cerebellar cortex; More reference expression data
BioGPS	n/a
Gene ontology
Molecular function	estrogen receptor binding
Cellular component	nucleus; cytoplasm
Biological process	positive regulation of intracellular estrogen receptor signaling pathway
Sources:Amigo / QuickGO
Orthologs
Databases	NCBI: entry; OMA: entry
Species	Human	Mouse
Entrez	149563	277744
Ensembl	ENSG00000183888	ENSMUSG00000070637
UniProt	Q8NEQ6	Q3ULG3
RefSeq (mRNA)	NM_178840	NM_001033374
RefSeq (protein)	NP_849162	NP_001028546
Location (UCSC)	Chr 1: 16 – 16.01 Mb	Chr 4: 141.16 – 141.16 Mb
PubMed search
- Wikidata
View/Edit Human	View/Edit Mouse

Steroid Receptor Associated and Regulated Protein (SRARP) in humans is a protein encoded by a gene of the same name with two exons that is located on chromosome 1p36.13. SRARP contains 169 amino acids and has a molecular weight of 17,657 Da.

== Expression and function in breast cancer ==
SRARP is co-expressed with the estrogen receptor (ER) and androgen receptor (AR) in breast cancer. In the ER-positive breast cancer cells, SRARP is involved in the transcriptional activities of ER and has shown an interaction with ER using the transient transfection of cells with SRARP and ER constructs. In addition, in AR+ breast cancer cells, SRARP interacts with the endogenous AR protein and acts as a transcriptional corepressor of AR. Furthermore, the activation of either AR or ER negatively regulates SRARP expression in breast cancer cells.

== Tumor suppressor function in malignancies ==
SRARP and HSPB7 are gene pairs that are positioned 5 kb apart on chromosome 1p36.13. It is notable that the loss of chromosome 1p36.1 is common in malignancies, occurring in 34% of tumors SRARP and HSPB7 are broadly inactivated in malignancies by epigenetic silencing, copy-number loss, and less frequently by somatic mutations. In addition, overexpression of SRARP or HSPB7 leads to tumor suppressor effects in cancer cell lines. Another similar molecular feature between SRARP and HSPB7 is the fact that both of these proteins interact with the 14-3-3 protein. Furthermore, SRARP is a potential cancer biomarker and SRARP inactivation predicts poor clinical outcome in malignancies and adjacent normal tissues using the analysis of large genomic datasets

Approved Symbol	SRARP
Approved Name	Steroid Receptor Associated and Regulated Protein
HGNC ID	HGNC:28339
Previous Symbol	C1orf64
Alias Symbols	MGC24047, ERRF
Chromosome location	1p36.13
Ensembl	ENSG00000183888
UniProt	Q8NEQ6
NCBI Gene	149563
RefSeq	NM_178840
UCSC	uc001axn.4
Protein Sequence	SRARP Protein Sequence (Ensembl)
Wikidata	Q21105563
PubMed	SRARP PubMed References
