= Astex Pharmaceuticals =

UK pharmaceutical company

- Type: Subsidiary
- Industry: Pharmaceuticals
- Founded: 1999; 27 years ago
- Headquarters: European Corporate and Research headquarters in Cambridge, UK (Astex Therapeutics Limited)
- Key people: Harren Jhoti (President and CEO); David Rees (Chief Scientific Officer)
- Products: Therapeutics for oncology and CNS disorders
- Parent: Otsuka Pharmaceutical
- Website: astx.com

Astex Pharmaceuticals is a biotechnology company focused on the discovery and development of drugs in oncology and diseases of the central nervous system. Astex was founded in 1999 by Sir Tom Blundell, Chris Abell and Harren Jhoti, and is located in Cambridge, England.

Astex is part of the Otsuka group of companies and is a wholly owned subsidiary of Otsuka Pharmaceutical Co. Ltd, headquartered in Tokyo, Japan.

== History ==
Astex was founded as "Astex Technology Limited" in 1999 in Cambridge, UK, to pioneer a novel approach to small molecule drug discovery known as ‘fragment-based drug discovery’ (FBDD), a term first coined by Astex scientists that is now a well recognized approach to small molecule drug discovery across the pharmaceutical industry. Astex's proprietary drug discovery platform, Pyramid, can effectively identify novel small molecule drugs for key disease targets. Originally funded by venture capital, from a number of investors including Abingworth, Advent international, Oxford Bioscience Partners, Apax Partners and Gimv. Astex established strategic partnerships with major pharmaceutical companies including Novartis, Janssen Pharmaceuticals and GlaxoSmithKline.

In 2005, the company changed its name to Astex Therapeutics Limited when its first product entered clinical development. In 2011, Astex Therapeutics Limited and SuperGen, Inc. (US) merged. Following the acquisition, SuperGen, Inc. changed its name to Astex Pharmaceuticals, Inc., and began trading under the ticker symbol ASTX on NASDAQ. The combined Astex entities were subsequently acquired by Otsuka Pharmaceutical in October 2013 for around US$900 million. On 1 January 2024, as part of an internal re-organization to consolidate oncology clinical development within the Otsuka group, Astex Pharmaceuticals, Inc., became part of Taiho Oncology, Inc. This internal reorganization did not impact the drug discovery research operation of Astex Pharmaceuticals (UK), based in Cambridge, UK, which continues to operate independently as ‘Astex’.

== Research and development ==
Astex is focused on precision medicine for oncology and central nervous system disorders. This approach involves first understanding the molecular basis of a disease and then developing a targeted therapy which can arrest or reverse its progression.

Astex’s Pyramid platform is focused on the rational design of novel small molecule targeted therapies. These therapies are based on the use of biophysical techniques, principally X-ray crystallography and cryo-electron microscopy (cryo-EM), to screen and identify very small, low molecular weight fragments of drugs binding to the disease target of interest. Astex uses its knowledge of the 3-dimensional structure of the binding interaction between the compound and the target to design and grow from the initial fragment, adding further functionality to improve the affinity and selectivity of the binding interaction so that the final drug compound interacts optimally with the disease target and modulates its activity – either through inhibition or activation.

In 2020, Astex and Taiho Pharmaceutical Co., Ltd. entered into a drug discovery collaboration with Merck & Co., Inc., Kenilworth, New Jersey, USA (known as MSD outside the USA and Canada) focused on the oncogene KRAS. This collaboration was extended in 2021. In 2023 Astex announced a further collaboration with MSD to identify small molecule candidates with activity towards the tumour suppressor protein p53 for the treatment of cancer.

== Clinical pipeline ==
Astex has a pipeline of investigational compounds currently in various stages of clinical development.

Several compounds from drug discovery collaborations with Astex have been advanced by Astex’s biopharma partners into clinical trials and onto the market, including ribociclib (brand name "Kisqali"), a CDK4/CDK6 inhibitor discovered in collaboration with Novartis that was granted approval in the US and EU in 2017 for the treatment of breast cancer. Astex's second partnered product to be approved is Erdafitinib (brand name "Balversa") an FGFR inhibitor that was discovered with Janssen Pharmaceuticals (a subsidiary of Johnson & Johnson), and received FDA market approval for the treatment of metastatic urothelial carcinoma in 2019 subsequent to an original collaboration on FGFR inhibitors between Astex and Newcastle University. Astex’s third partnered product to reach approval is Capivasertib (brand name "Truqap") which was discovered by AstraZeneca subsequent to its collaboration with Astex and Astex’s earlier collaboration with The Institute of Cancer Research (ICR)/Cancer Research UK (CRUK). AstraZeneca began to develop the drug as a potential treatment for various forms of cancer after its discovery in 2010. Truqap in combination with Fulvestrant (brand name "Faslodex") was approved in the US for the treatment of adult patients with hormone receptor (HR)-positive, HER2-negative locally advanced or metastatic breast cancer with one or more biomarker alterations (PIK3CA, AKT1 or PTEN) in 2023.
