= Flavonoid alkaloid =

Natural product produced by plants

A flavonoid alkaloid also known as a flavoalkaloid is a type of natural product produced by plants that contains both a flavonoid core structure and a nitrogen containing substituent so that the substance is also classified as an alkaloid. The most common flavonoid alkaloids contain a nitrogen heterocycle such as a pyridine or piperidine which is covalently bonded to the A-ring of a chromone. One flavonoid alkaloid, lilaline, was isolated from Lilium candidum in 1987. The synthesis of flavonoid alkaloids has been achieved

== Pharmacology ==
A number of flavonoid alkaloids have been discovered that possess diverse pharmacological activity that may have application in the treatment of a range of diseases. One example is alvocidib, a potent CDK9 kinase inhibitor that is being developed for the treatment of chronic lymphocytic leukemia (CLL) and acute myeloid leukemia (AML). Flavonoid alkaloids were also found to present alpha-glucosidase inhibitory activity through artificial organic synthesis.
