= Dinaciclib =

Chemical compound

Clinical data
- Other names: SCH-727965

Legal status
- Legal status: Investigational

Identifiers
- IUPAC name: (S)-3-(((3-Ethyl-5-(2-(2-hydroxyethyl)piperidin-1-yl)pyrazolo[1,5-a]pyrimidin-7-yl)amino)methyl)pyridine 1-oxide
- CAS Number: 779353-01-4
- PubChem CID: 46926350
- IUPHAR/BPS: 7379
- ChemSpider: 25027387
- UNII: 4V8ECV0NBQ
- KEGG: D09604
- ChEBI: CHEBI:95060
- ChEMBL: ChEMBL2103840
- PDB ligand: 1QK (PDBe, RCSB PDB)
- CompTox Dashboard (EPA): DTXSID90999131
- ECHA InfoCard: 100.246.885

Chemical and physical data
- Formula: C_{21}H_{28}N_{6}O_{2}
- Molar mass: 396.495 g·mol^{−1}
- 3D model (JSmol): Interactive image
- SMILES: CCC1=C2N=C(C=C(N2N=C1)NCC3=C[N+](=CC=C3)[O-])N4CCCC[C@H]4CCO
- InChI: InChI=1S/C21H28N6O2/c1-2-17-14-23-27-19(22-13-16-6-5-9-25(29)15-16)12-20(24-21(17)27)26-10-4-3-7-18(26)8-11-28/h5-6,9,12,14-15,18,22,28H,2-4,7-8,10-11,13H2,1H3/t18-/m0/s1; Key:PIMQWRZWLQKKBJ-SFHVURJKSA-N

Dinaciclib (SCH-727965) is an experimental drug that inhibits cyclin-dependent kinases (CDKs). It is being evaluated in clinical trials for various cancer indications.

Dinaciclib is being developed by Merck & Co. It was granted orphan drug status by the FDA in 2011.

== Mechanisms of action ==
- Cyclin-dependent kinase inhibitor dinaciclib interacts with the acetyl-lysine recognition site of bromodomains.
- Dinaciclib (SCH727665) inhibits the unfolded protein response (UPR) through a CDK1 and CDK5-dependent mechanism.

== Anti-tumoral action ==
- In melanoma
  - The anti-melanoma activity of dinaciclib is dependent on p53 signaling.
- In chronic lymphocytic leukemia (CLL)
  - Dinaciclib promotes apoptosis and abrogates microenvironmental cytokine protection in chronic lymphocytic leukemia cells.
- In pancreatic cancer
  - Dinaciclib inhibits pancreatic cancer growth and progression in murine xenograft models.
- In osteosarcoma
  - Dinacliclib induces the apoptosis of osteosarcoma cells.
  - Apoptosis of osteosarcoma cultures can be induced by the combination of the cyclin-dependent kinase inhibitor SCH727965 and a heat shock protein 90 inhibitor.

== Role in developing neurons ==
In primary cultured neurons, dinaciclib regulates neurogenesis, where it reduces expression of upper layer marker Satb2, and induces CTIP2, expressed in neurons of deeper layers.

== Clinical trials ==
- Phase II
  - Advanced breast cancer
  - Non-small cell lung cancer (NSCLC)
  - Multiple myeloma
  - Advanced melanoma
- Phase III
  - A comparison of dinaciclib and ofatumumab for treatment of CLL
