= Alvocidib =

Names
- IUPAC name 2′-Chloro-5,7-dihydroxy-8-[(3S,4R)-3-hydroxy-1-methylpiperidin-4-yl]flavone
- Systematic IUPAC name 2-(2-Chlorophenyl)-5,7-dihydroxy-8-[(3S,4R)-3-hydroxy-1-methylpiperidin-4-yl]-4H-1-benzopyran-4-one
- Other names Flavopiridol, HMR 1275, L-868275

Identifiers
CAS Number	146426-40-6
3D model (JSmol)	Interactive image
ChEBI	CHEBI:47344
ChEMBL	ChEMBL428690
ChemSpider	4450222
DrugBank	DB03496
IUPHAR/BPS	5680
KEGG	D09868
MeSH	Flavopiridol
PubChem CID	5287969
UNII	45AD6X575G
CompTox Dashboard (EPA)	DTXSID20904970
- InChI: InChI=1S/C21H20ClNO5/c1-23-7-6-12(17(27)10-23)19-14(24)8-15(25)20-16(26)9-18(28-21(19)20)11-4-2-3-5-13(11)22/h2-5,8-9,12,17,24-25,27H,6-7,10H2,1H3/t12-,17+/m0/s1 Key: BIIVYFLTOXDAOV-YVEFUNNKSA-N
- SMILES: Clc4ccccc4C=2Oc1c(c(O)cc(O)c1C(=O)C=2)[C@H]3CCN(C)C[C@H]3O

Properties
Chemical formula	C_{21}H_{20}ClNO_{5}
Molar mass	401.8402
- Except where otherwise noted, data are given for materials in their standard state (at 25 °C [77 °F], 100 kPa). verify (what is ?) Infobox references

Alvocidib (INN; also known as flavopiridol) is a flavonoid alkaloid CDK9 kinase inhibitor under clinical development by Tolero Pharmaceuticals for the treatment of acute myeloid leukemia. It has been studied also for the treatment of arthritis and atherosclerotic plaque formation. The target of alvocidib is the positive transcription elongation factor P-TEFb. Treatment of cells with alvocidib leads to inhibition of P-TEFb and the loss of mRNA production.

The compound is a synthetic analog of natural product rohitukine which was initially extracted from Aphanamixis polystachya (formerly Amoora rohituka, hence the name) and later from Dysoxylum binectariferum.

== Orphan drug ==
The FDA has granted orphan drug designation to alvocidib for the treatment of patients with acute myeloid leukemia.
