= Seliciclib =

Names
- Preferred IUPAC name (2R)-2-{[6-(Benzylamino)-9-(propan-2-yl)-9H-purin-2-yl]amino}butan-1-ol
- Other names Roscovitine; CYC202

Identifiers
CAS Number	186692-46-6
3D model (JSmol)	Interactive image
ChEMBL	ChEMBL14762
ChemSpider	140922
IUPHAR/BPS	6035
MeSH	roscovitine
PubChem CID	160355
UNII	0ES1C2KQ94
CompTox Dashboard (EPA)	DTXSID20171928
- InChI: InChI=1S/C19H26N6O/c1-4-15(11-26)22-19-23-17(20-10-14-8-6-5-7-9-14)16-18(24-19)25(12-21-16)13(2)3/h5-9,12-13,15,26H,4,10-11H2,1-3H3,(H2,20,22,23,24)/t15-/m1/s1 Key: BTIHMVBBUGXLCJ-OAHLLOKOSA-N; InChI=1/C19H26N6O/c1-4-15(11-26)22-19-23-17(20-10-14-8-6-5-7-9-14)16-18(24-19)25(12-21-16)13(2)3/h5-9,12-13,15,26H,4,10-11H2,1-3H3,(H2,20,22,23,24)/t15-/m1/s1 Key: BTIHMVBBUGXLCJ-OAHLLOKOBS
- SMILES: CC[C@H](CO)NC1=NC(=C2C(=N1)N(C=N2)C(C)C)NCC3=CC=CC=C3

Properties
Chemical formula	C_{19}H_{26}N_{6}O
Molar mass	354.458 g·mol^{−1}
- Except where otherwise noted, data are given for materials in their standard state (at 25 °C [77 °F], 100 kPa). verify (what is ?) Infobox references

Seliciclib (roscovitine or CYC202) is an experimental drug candidate in the family of pharmacological cyclin-dependent kinase (CDK) inhibitors that inhibit multiple enzyme targets including CDK2, CDK7 and CDK9, which alter the growth phase or state within the cell cycle of treated cells. Seliciclib is being developed by Cyclacel.

This is a phase II, dose ranging, multicenter, randomized, double-blind, placebo-controlled study. The aim of this study is to assess the safety of increasing doses of roscovitine administered orally for 4 cycles of 4 consecutive days separated by a 3 days treatment free period in adult CF subjects with cystic fibrosis carrying two cystic fibrosis-causing mutations with at least one F508del-CFTR mutation and chronically infected with Pseudomonas aeruginosa. This study involved 36 cystic fibrosis patients including 24 treated and 12 controls.

Seliciclib is being studied for the treatment of non-small cell lung cancer (NSCLC), Cushing's disease, leukemia, HIV infection, Parkinson's disease, herpes simplex infection, cystic fibrosis and the mechanisms of chronic inflammation disorders.

Seliciclib is a 2,6,9-substituted purine analog. Its structure in complex with CDK2 was determined in 1996. Seliciclib inhibits CDK2/E, CDK2/A, CDK7 and CDK9.

== Clinical trials and lab tests ==
=== Cancer treatment ===
Seliciclib has been found to produce apoptosis in treated cancerous cells of non-small cell lung cancer (NSCLC) and other cancers. Seliciclib has previously undergone Phase IIa clinical trials, in 240 NSCLC patients as a combined dose with existing first- and second-line treatments. In the current APPRAISE trial, the research drug is undergoing Phase IIb clinical trial as a monotherapy for NSCLC in third-line patients. The side-effects reported in Phase I trials of seliciclib for NSCLC were "nausea, vomiting, transient elevations in serum creatinine and liver function parameters and transient hypokalemia".

=== Immunological disorders ===
Seliciclib is also in clinical trials for B-cell lymphomas, including multiple myeloma. Seliciclib has been shown to inhibit RNA polymerase II-dependent transcription and down-regulation of the protein MCL1.

Seliciclib has been shown in vitro to induce apoptosis in neutrophil granulocytes. If this mechanism turns out to be safe, reliable and efficient in vivo, the drug could improve treatment of chronic inflammation diseases such as cystic fibrosis and arthritis. These are usually treated with glucocorticoids which often have serious side effects

=== Neurological therapies ===
In the nervous system, seliciclib has been shown to suppress microglial activation and to provide some neuroprotection in animal models of cerebral ischemia. Furthermore, it increases antitumor activity of temozolomide in treatment of glioblastoma multiforme and is considered as a possible therapeutic option for glioma.

=== Antiviral effect ===
Seliciclib is also a possible antiviral agent. It causes the death of cells infected with HIV and preventing the replication of herpes simplex virus.

=== Ovum production ===
Seliciclib has been shown to cause parthenogenetic egg activation. However it does create abnormal second polar bodies and therefore possible aneuploid zygotes. Egg activation usually involves calcium oscillations however this does not happen with seliciclib. Seciclib causes egg activation by inhibiting protein kinases which results in the inactivation of the maturation promoting factor (MPF).

=== Renal hypertrophy ===
Seliciclib reduces renal hypertrophy by 45% after 5/6 nephrectomy.

== Side effects ==
Causes severe side effects that can not be tolerated on daily dosing. Side effects include hypokalemia and elevation of liver enzymes. Due to these side effects, seliciclib has not been approved by the USFDA.
