= Ribociclib =

Chemical compound

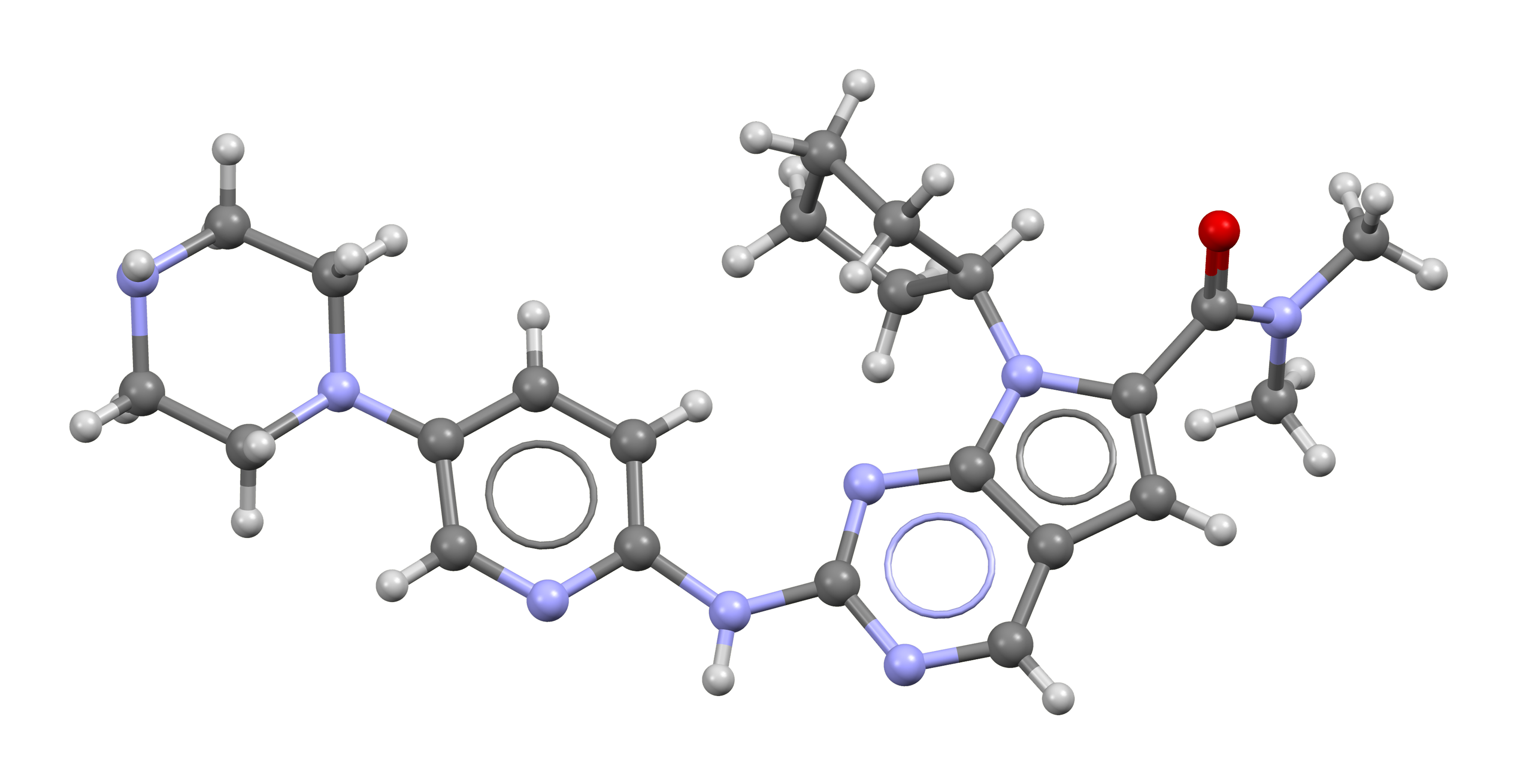

Clinical data
- Pronunciation: /ˌraɪboʊˈsaɪklɪb/ RY-boh-SYE-klib
- Trade names: Kisqali, Kryxana
- Other names: LEE 011
- AHFS/Drugs.com: Monograph
- MedlinePlus: a617008
- License data: US DailyMed: Ribociclib
- Routes of administration: By mouth
- Drug class: Antineoplastic, CDK inhibitor
- ATC code: L01EF02 (WHO)

Legal status
- Legal status: AU: S4 (Prescription only); CA: ℞-only; US: ℞-only; EU: Rx-only

Pharmacokinetic data
- Bioavailability: Unknown
- Protein binding: ~70%
- Metabolism: Liver (CYP3A4)
- Elimination half-life: 32.0 (29.7–54.7) hrs
- Excretion: 69% feces, 23% urine

Identifiers
- IUPAC name: 7-Cyclopentyl-N,N-dimethyl-2-{[5-(1-piperazinyl)-2-pyridinyl]amino}-7H-pyrrolo[2,3-d]pyrimidine-6-carboxamide
- CAS Number: 1211441-98-3
- PubChem CID: 44631912
- DrugBank: DB11730
- ChemSpider: 30798107
- UNII: TK8ERE8P56
- KEGG: D10883; as salt: D10979
- ChEMBL: ChEMBL3545110
- CompTox Dashboard (EPA): DTXSID201021027
- ECHA InfoCard: 100.234.566

Chemical and physical data
- Formula: C_{23}H_{30}N_{8}O
- Molar mass: 434.548 g·mol^{−1}
- 3D model (JSmol): Interactive image
- SMILES: CN(C)C(=O)c1cc2cnc(nc2n1C3CCCC3)Nc4ccc(cn4)N5CCNCC5
- InChI: InChI=1S/C23H30N8O/c1-29(2)22(32)19-13-16-14-26-23(28-21(16)31(19)17-5-3-4-6-17)27-20-8-7-18(15-25-20)30-11-9-24-10-12-30/h7-8,13-15,17,24H,3-6,9-12H2,1-2H3,(H,25,26,27,28); Key:RHXHGRAEPCAFML-UHFFFAOYSA-N

Ribociclib, sold under the brand name Kisqali, is a medication used for the treatment of certain kinds of breast cancer. Ribociclib is a kinase inhibitor. It was developed by Novartis and Astex Pharmaceuticals.

The most common side effects include infections, low levels of white blood cells, headache, cough, nausea (feeling sick), vomiting, diarrhea, constipation, tiredness, hair loss and rash.

Ribociclib was approved for medical use in the United States in March 2017, in the European Union in August 2017, and in the United Kingdom in February 2021.

== Medical uses ==
In the United States, it is indicated for the treatment of adults with hormone receptor (HR)-positive, human epidermal growth factor receptor 2 (HER2)-negative advanced or metastatic breast cancer in combination with an aromatase inhibitor as initial endocrine-based therapy; or fulvestrant as initial endocrine-based therapy or following disease progression on endocrine therapy in postmenopausal women or in men.

In the European Union, it is indicated for the treatment of women with hormone receptor (HR)‑positive, human epidermal growth factor receptor 2 (HER2)‑negative locally advanced or metastatic breast cancer in combination with an aromatase inhibitor or fulvestrant as initial endocrine-based therapy, or in women who have received prior endocrine therapy. In pre‑ or perimenopausal women, the endocrine therapy should be combined with a luteinising hormone‑releasing hormone (LHRH) agonist.

In September 2024, the US Food and Drug Administration (FDA) expanded the indication for ribociclib, in combination with an aromatase inhibitor, for the adjuvant treatment of adults with hormone receptor (HR)-positive, human epidermal growth factor receptor 2 (HER2)-negative stage II and III early breast cancer at high risk of recurrence. Additionally, the FDA approved the ribociclib and letrozole co-pack for the same indication.

In November 2024, the European Commission expanded the indication of ribociclib, in combination with an aromatase inhibitor, for the adjuvant treatment of adults with hormone receptor (HR)-positive, human epidermal growth factor receptor 2 (HER2)-negative early breast cancer at high risk of recurrence.

== Side effects ==
The most common side effects in studies were decreased blood cell counts, mainly neutropenia (in 75% of patients, as compared to 5% under placebo), but also anemia (18% vs. 5%). Gastrointestinal disorders were also common, for example nausea (52% vs. 29%) and diarrhea (35% vs. 22%), as was alopecia (33% vs. 16%). The drug also increases the QT interval and liver enzymes (alanine transaminase, aspartate transaminase).

The most common side effects include infections, low levels of white blood cells, headache, cough, nausea, vomiting, diarrhoea, constipation, tiredness, hair loss and rash. The most common severe side effects include infections, low levels of red and white blood cells, vomiting, abnormal blood tests for liver function and low levels of phosphate in the blood (hypophosphataemia).

== Interactions ==
As ribociclib is mainly metabolized by the liver enzyme CYP3A4, inhibitors of this enzyme increase its concentrations in the body and could potentiate side effects and toxicity. Examples of such inhibitors include ketoconazole and similar antifungal drugs, ritonavir, clarithromycin, as well as grapefruit. Conversely, drugs that induce CYP3A4, such as rifampicin and St John's Wort, can decrease ribociclib concentrations.

Ribociclib itself is a moderate to strong CYP3A4 inhibitor and can increase concentrations of other drugs that share this metabolism, as has been shown with midazolam. It also inhibits a number of transporter proteins and could thus theoretically interfere with the transport of other drugs in the body. It could also amplify QT prolongation of other drugs such as antiarrhythmics, clarithromycin, and haloperidol.

== Pharmacology ==
=== Pharmacodynamics ===
Cyclin-dependent kinases (CDKs) 4 and 6 are enzymes that have been shown to promote cell division and multiplication in both normal and cancer cells. Many cancer cells have shown abnormalities that increase the activity of CDK, leading to the inactivation of certain tumor suppressor genes.

When used in combination with other drugs such as an ALK inhibitor or an MEK inhibitor, ribociclib has been shown to have a synergistic effect, resulting in improved responses. Again, this is likely a result of "crosstalk" between signaling pathways. Simply blocking one pathway in cancer tumorigenesis can sometimes result in "tumor compensation", where the tumor compensates for the blocked signaling pathway by utilizing other pathways to survive. By blocking several pathways at once, it is thought that the tumor is less able to compensate, and a greater anti-tumor response is often observed. Utilizing ribociclib in combination with other agents has been shown to reduce the development of resistance to these agents.

=== Pharmacokinetics ===
The percentage of ribociclib absorbed in the gut has not been determined. Highest blood plasma levels are reached after one to four hours; and after repeated dosage, steady state concentrations are reached after about eight days. Food intake has no effect on absorption rates. When in the bloodstream, about 70% of ribociclib is bound to plasma proteins.

The substance is mainly metabolized by CYP3A4 and subsequently by various phase II enzymes, resulting in a large number of metabolites. Those with highest blood plasma concentrations in humans are called CCI284 (an unspecified N-hydroxylation product), LEQ803 (the N-demethylation product) and M1 (a glucuronide). All metabolites have negligible clinical activity.

Ribociclib has a slight tendency to accumulate in the body. It is eliminated with an average biological half-life of 32 hours, mostly (69%) via the feces, but also (23%) via the urine. The unchanged drug accounts for 17% of the substance in the feces and 12% of the substance in the urine, the rest being metabolites.

== Chemistry ==
Ribociclib is used in form of its succinate salt. It is a slightly hygroscopic yellow to brown crystalline powder that is soluble in aqueous acids.

== History ==
Ribociclib demonstrated a clinical benefit on overall survival across all three phase III trials of the MONALEESA clinical program with different endocrine therapy partners, regardless of menopausal status or line of therapy. The European Society of Medical Oncology (ESMO) assigned the highest score on the 'Magnitude of Clinical Benefit Scale' for ribociclib.

In the clinical trial relevant for the drug's approval, ribociclib significantly improved progression-free survival, that is, the time span the cancer did not get worse. For participants receiving placebo plus letrozole, progression-free survival was 16 months on average, while under ribociclib plus letrozole, progression-free survival was 25 months as of the January 2017 analysis.

In October 2024, the Committee for Medicinal Products for Human Use of the European Medicines Agency recommended a change to the terms of the marketing authorization for ribociclib to add the adjuvant treatment of people with hormone receptor-positive/human epidermal growth factor receptor 2-negative early breast cancer, at high risk of disease recurrence. The marketing authorization holder is Novartis Europharm Limited. In November 2024, the European Commission expanded the marketing authorization to include the use of ribociclib in combination with an aromatase inhibitor for the adjuvant treatment of patients with hormone receptor -positive, human epidermal growth factor receptor 2 -negative early breast cancer at high risk of recurrence.
