= Hormone receptor positive breast cancer =

A hormone-receptor-positive (HR+) tumor is a tumor which consists of cells that express receptors for certain hormones. The term most commonly refers to estrogen receptor positive tumors (i.e. tumors that contain estrogen receptor positive cells), but can also include progesterone receptor positive tumors. Estrogen-receptor-positive tumors depend on the presence of estrogen for ongoing proliferation.

== Classification ==
ER-positive is one of the receptor statuses identified in the classification of breast cancer. Receptor status was traditionally considered by reviewing each individual receptor (ER, PR, her2) in turn, but newer approaches look at these together, along with the tumor grade, to categorize breast cancer into several conceptual molecular classes that have different prognoses and may have different responses to specific therapies. DNA microarrays have assisted this approach.

Breast tumors that do not express ER, PR or Her2 are referred to as triple-negative breast cancers.

== Treatment ==
Endocrine treatment may be beneficial for patients with hormone receptor positive breast tumors.

There are two ways for treating these kind of tumors:

- Lowering systemic levels of estrogen, achieved by the use of drugs from the aromatase inhibitor category. These drugs target one of the enzymes that takes part in the biosynthesis of estrogen.
- Blockage of the estrogen receptors on the cancerous cells, thus preventing estrogen binding, leading to decreased proliferation. Drugs in this category are referred to as SERMs (selective estrogen receptor modulator) since they are able to block estrogen receptors in a selective manner.

== See also ==
- Tamoxifen
- Raloxifene
- Tegtociclib
