= List of chemotherapeutic agents =

Drugs that are useful against cancer

This is a list of chemotherapeutic agents, also known as cytotoxic agents or cytostatic drugs, that are known to be of use in chemotherapy for cancer. This list is organized by type of agent, although the subsections are not necessarily definitive and are subject to revision. Each drug is listed once (at present), though it might fall in more than one subsection. A full alphabetical listing is included after the categorical listing.

The agents in this list are often combined into chemotherapy agent for polychemotherapy (combination chemotherapy). For example, the CHOP regimen consists of cyclophosphamide, doxorubicin, vincristine and prednisone.

Besides chemotherapy, medical oncology (pharmacotherapy for cancer) includes several noncytotoxic classes of therapy, such as hormonal therapy and targeted therapy (biologic therapy). Those agents are described in the relevant articles.

See also: List of antineoplastic agents

== Alkylating agents ==
- Altretamine
- Bendamustine
- Busulfan
- Carboquone
- Carmustine
- Chlorambucil
- Chlormethine
- Chlorozotocin
- Cyclophosphamide
- Dacarbazine
- Fotemustine
- Ifosfamide
- Lomustine
- Melphalan
- Melphalan flufenamide
- Mitobronitol
- Nimustine
- Nitrosoureas
- Pipobroman
- Ranimustine
- Semustine
- Streptozotocin
- Temozolomide
- Thiotepa
- Treosulfan
- Triaziquone
- Triethylenemelamine
- Trofosfamide
- Uramustine

== Anthracyclines ==
- Aclarubicin
- Daunorubicin
- Doxorubicin
- Epirubicin
- Idarubicin
- Mitoxantrone
- Pirarubicin
- Valrubicin
- Zorubicin

== Cytoskeletal disruptors (taxanes) ==
- Abraxane
- Cabazitaxel
- Docetaxel
- Larotaxel
- Paclitaxel
- Taxotere
- Tesetaxel

== Epothilones ==
- Ixabepilone

== Histone deacetylase inhibitors ==
- Entinostat
- Romidepsin
- Vorinostat
- Zabadinostat

== Inhibitors of topoisomerase I ==
- Belotecan
- Camptothecin
- Exatecan
- Gimatecan
- Irinotecan
- Topotecan

== Inhibitors of topoisomerase II ==
- Etoposide
- Teniposide
- Tafluposide

== Kinase inhibitors ==
- Bortezomib
- Erlotinib
- Gefitinib
- Imatinib
- Vemurafenib
- Vismodegib

== Nucleotide analogs and precursor analogs ==
- Azacitidine
- Azathioprine
- Capecitabine
- Cladribine
- Clofarabine
- Cytarabine
- Decitabine
- Doxifluridine
- Fludarabine
- Fluorouracil
- Gemcitabine
- Hydroxyurea
- Mercaptopurine
- Methotrexate
- Nelarabine
- Pemetrexed
- Tioguanine (formerly Thioguanine)

== Peptide antibiotics ==
- Actinomycin
- Bleomycin

== Platinum-based agents ==
- Carboplatin
- Cisplatin
- Dicycloplatin
- Oxaliplatin
- Nedaplatin
- Satraplatin

== Retinoids ==
- Alitretinoin
- Bexarotene
- Tretinoin

== Vinca alkaloids and derivatives ==
- Vinblastine
- Vincristine
- Vindesine
- Vinorelbine

== Full alphabetical listing ==
- Abraxane
- Actinomycin
- Alitretinoin
- All-trans retinoic acid
- Altretamine
- Azacitidine
- Azathioprine
- Belotecan
- Bendamustine
- Bexarotene
- Bleomycin
- Bortezomib
- Busulfan
- Cabazitaxel
- Camptothecin
- Carboplatin
- Carboquone
- Carmustine
- Capecitabine
- Cisplatin
- Chlorambucil
- Chlormethine
- Chlorozotocin
- Cladribine
- Clofarabine
- Cyclophosphamide
- Cytarabine
- Dacarbazine
- Daunorubicin
- Decitabine
- Docetaxel
- Doxifluridine
- Doxorubicin
- Epirubicin
- Epothilone
- Erlotinib
- Etoposide
- Exatecan
- Fludarabine
- Fluorouracil
- Fotemustine
- Gefitinib
- Gemcitabine
- Gimatecan
- Hydroxyurea
- Idarubicin
- Ifosfamide
- Imatinib
- Irinotecan
- Ixabepilone
- Larotaxel
- Lomustine
- Melphalan
- Melphalan flufenamide
- Mercaptopurine
- Methotrexate
- Mitobronitol
- Mitomycin C
- Mitoxantrone
- Nelarabine
- Nimustine
- Nitrosoureas
- Oxaliplatin
- Paclitaxel
- Pemetrexed
- Pipobroman
- Ranimustine
- Romidepsin
- Semustine
- Streptozotocin
- Tafluposide
- Taxotere
- Temozolomide
- Tesetaxel
- Teniposide
- Thiotepa
- Tioguanine
- Topotecan
- Treosulfan
- Tretinoin
- Triaziquone
- Triethylenemelamine
- Valrubicin
- Vemurafenib
- Vinblastine
- Vincristine
- Vindesine
- Vinorelbine
- Vismodegib
- Vorinostat
