= List of antineoplastic agents =

This is a list of antineoplastic agents used to treat cancer. See also: List of chemotherapeutic agents

Antineoplastic agents
INN	Route	Mechanism of action	Indications	Major toxicities
1. Cytotoxic antineoplastics
1.01 Nucleoside analogues
Azacitidine	SC, IV	DNA methyltransferase inhibitor and incorporates itself into RNA, hence inhibiting gene expression.	Myelodysplastic syndromes, acute myeloid leukaemia and chronic myeloid leukaemia	Myelosuppression, kidney failure (uncommon/rare), renal tubular acidosis and hypokalaemia.
Capecitabine	PO	Fluorouracil prodrug	Breast, colorectal, gastric and oesophageal cancer	Myelosuppression, cardiotoxicity, hypertriglyceridaemia, GI haemorrhage (uncommon), cerebellar syndrome (uncommon), encephalopathy (uncommon) and diarrhoea.
Carmofur	PO	Fluorouracil prodrug	Colorectal, breast and ovarian cancer	Myelosuppression, neurotoxicity and diarrhoea.
Cladribine	SC, IV	DNA methyltransferase inhibitor, metabolites incorporate themselves into DNA.	Hairy cell leukaemia, chronic lymphocytic leukaemia	Myelosuppression, haemolytic anaemia (uncommon), neurotoxicity (rare), renal impairment (rare), pulmonary interstitial infiltrates (rare), Stevens–Johnson syndrome (rare) and toxic epidermal necrolysis (rare).
Clofarabine	IV	Ribonucleotide reductase and DNA polymerase inhibitor.	Acute lymphoblastic leukaemia and acute myeloid leukaemia	Myelosuppression, hypokalaemia, cytokine release syndrome, Stevens–Johnson syndrome (uncommon), toxic epidermal necrolysis (uncommon) and pancreatitis (uncommon)
Cytarabine	SC, IM, IV, IT	DNA polymerase inhibitor, S-phase specific. Incorporates its metabolites into DNA.	Acute myeloid leukaemia, acute lymphoblastic leukaemia, chronic myeloid leukaemia, lymphomas, progressive multifocal leucoencephalopathy and meningeal leukaemia	Myelosuppression, GI bleeds, pancreatitis (uncommon/rare), anaphylaxis (uncommon/rare), pericarditis (uncommon/rare) and conjunctivitis (uncommon/rare). High dose: cerebral and cerebellar dysfunction, ocular toxicity, pulmonary toxicity, severe GI ulceration and peripheral neuropathy (rare).
Decitabine	IV	DNA methyltransferase inhibitor.	Myelodysplastic syndrome, sickle cell anaemia (orphan), acute myeloid leukaemia and chronic myeloid leukaemia.	Myelosuppression, hyperglycaemia, hypoalbuminaemia, hypomagnesaemia, hypokalaemia, hyperkalaemia and thrombocythaemia.
Floxuridine	IA	Fluorouracil analogue.	Metastatic GI adenocarcinoma and stomach cancer	Myelosuppression.
Fludarabine	PO, IV	DNA polymerase and ribonucleotide reductase inhibitor.	Acute myeloid leukaemia, chronic lymphocytic leukaemia, non-Hodgkin lymphoma and Waldenstrom macroglobulinaemia.	Myelosuppression, hyperglycaemia, GI bleeds (uncommon), pneumonitis (uncommon), haemolytic anaemia (uncommon), severe neurotoxicity (rare), haemorrhagic cystitis (rare), Stevens–Johnson syndrome (rare) and toxic epidermal necrolysis (rare).
Fluorouracil	IV, Topical	Thymidylate synthase inhibitor.	Anal, breast, colorectal, gastric, head and neck, oesophageal and pancreatic cancer. Bowen's disease and actinic keratoses.	Myelosuppression, diarrhoea, cardiotoxicity, GI ulceration and bleeding (uncommon), cerebellar syndrome (uncommon), encephalopathy (uncommon) and anaphylaxis (rare).
Gemcitabine	IV	DNA synthesis inhibitor, induces apoptosis specifically in S-phase.	Bladder, breast, nasopharyngeal, non-small cell lung, ovarian and pancreatic cancer, lymphomas and inflammatory bowel disease.	Myelosuppression, pulmonary toxicity, kidney failure (rare), haemolytic uraemic syndrome (rare), thrombotic thrombocytopenic purpura (rare), anaphylactoid reaction (rare), reversible posterior leukoencephalopathy syndrome (rare), myocardial infarction (rare) and heart failure (rare).
Mercaptopurine	PO	Purine synthesis inhibitor.	Acute lymphoblastic leukaemia, acute promyelocytic leukaemia, lymphoblastic lymphoma and inflammatory bowel disease.	Myelosuppression, hepatotoxicity, GI ulceration (rare), pancreatitis (rare) and secondary leukaemia (rare) or myelodysplasia (rare).
Nelarabine	IV	Purine synthesis inhibitor.	Acute lymphoblastic leukaemia and chronic lymphocytic leukaemia.	Myelosuppression, pleural effusion, seizures, tumour lysis syndrome and a condition similar to Guillain-Barré syndrome.
Pentostatin	IV	Adenosine deaminase inhibitor.	Hairy cell leukaemia, peripheral T-cell lymphoma (orphan), cutaneous T cell lymphoma (orphan) and chronic lymphocytic leukaemia (orphan).	Myelosuppression, neurotoxicity, immune hypersensitivity, hyponatraemia, thrombotic thrombocytopenic purpura and microangiopathic hemolytic anaemia.
Tegafur	PO	Thymidylate synthase inhibitor.	Breast, colorectal cancer, gallbladder, gastrointestinal tract, head and neck, liver and pancreas cancer.	Myelosuppression, diarrhoea, neurotoxicity and hepatitis (rare).
Tioguanine	PO	Purine synthesis inhibitor.	Acute lymphoblastic leukaemia and acute myeloid leukaemia	Myelosuppression, hepatotoxicity, peripheral neuropathy (uncommon), intestinal necrosis (rare) and perforation (rare).
1.02 Antifolates
Methotrexate	SC, IM, IV, IT, PO	Dihydrofolate reductase inhibitor.	Bladder and breast cancer. squamous cell carcinoma of head and neck, gestational trophoblastic disease, acute leukaemias, non-Hodgkin lymphoma, osteosarcoma, brain tumours, graft-versus-host disease and systemic sclerosis.	Myelosuppression, pulmonary toxicity, hepatotoxicity, neurotoxicity (high dose or intrathecal administration), anaphylactic reactions (rare), Stevens–Johnson syndrome (rare), Toxic Epidermal Necrolysis (rare), kidney failure (rare), osteoporosis (rare), skin and bone necrosis (rare) and macrocytic anaemia (rare).
Pemetrexed	IV	Dihydrofolate reductase, thymidylate synthase and glycinamide ribonucleotide formyltransferase inhibitors.	Malignant mesothelioma and non-squamous non-small cell lung cancer.	Myelosuppression, renal impairment, peripheral neuropathy, supraventricular tachycardia (uncommon), hepatitis (rare), colitis (rare), pneumonitis (rare), radiation recall (rare), Stevens–Johnson syndrome (rare) and toxic epidermal necrolysis (rare).
Pralatrexate	IV	Dihydrofolate reductase, thymidylate synthase and glycinamide ribonucleotide formyltransferase inhibitors.	Peripheral T cell lymphomas	Febrile neutropenia (uncommon) renal failure (uncommon), peripheral neuropathy (uncommon), hepatotoxicity (rare)
Raltitrexed	IV	Dihydrofolate reductase and thymidylate synthase inhibitor.	Colorectal cancer	Myelosuppression
Trimetrexate	IV	Dihydrofolate reductase, thymidylate synthase and glycinamide ribonucleotide formyltransferase inhibitors.	Pneumocystis jirovecii	Neutropenia, febrile neutropenia (uncommon), renal failure (uncommon) peripheral neuropathy (uncommon)
1.03 Other antimetabolites
Hydroxycarbamide	PO	Inhibits DNA synthesis by inhibiting the enzyme ribonucleotide reductase.	Chronic myeloid leukaemia, essential thrombocytosis, polycythaemia vera, myelofibrosis, acute myeloid leukaemia and sickle cell anaemia	Myelosuppression, skin cancer (rare), oedema (rare), hallucinations (rare), seizures (rare) and pulmonary toxicity (rare).
1.04 Topoisomerase I inhibitor
Irinotecan	IV	Inhibits topoisomerase I.	Colorectal cancer	Diarrhoea, myelosuppression, pulmonary infiltrates (uncommon), bradycardia (uncommon), ileus (rare) and colitis (rare).
Topotecan	IV	Inhibits topoisomerase I.	Small cell lung cancer, ovarian cancer and cervical cancer	Diarrhoea, myelosuppression, interstitial lung disease and allergy.
1.05 Anthracyclines
Daunorubicin	IV	Inhibits DNA and RNA synthesis by intercalating DNA base pairs. Inhibits DNA repair by inhibiting topoisomerase II.	Acute leukaemias	Myelosuppression, cardiotoxicity, anaphylaxis (rare), secondary malignancies (particularly acute myeloid leukaemia and myelodysplastic syndrome) and radiation recall.
Doxorubicin	IV	As above.	Breast cancer, lymphomas, sarcomas, bladder cancer, acute lymphoblastic leukaemia, Wilms' tumour, AIDS-related Kaposi's sarcoma, neuroblastoma and multiple myeloma	As above.
Epirubicin	IV	As above.	Breast cancer, gastric cancer and bladder cancer	As above.
Idarubicin	IV, PO	As above.	Acute leukaemias.	As above.
Mitoxantrone	IV	As above.	Non-Hodgkin lymphoma, acute myeloid leukaemia, prostate cancer and multiple sclerosis	As above.
Valrubicin	IV	As above.	Bladder cancer.	As above.
1.06 Podophyllotoxins
Etoposide	IV, PO	Topoisomerase II inhibitor.	Testicular cancer, ovarian cancer, lung cancer, acute myeloid leukaemia, lymphomas and sarcomas	Myelosuppression, hypersensitivity reactions, Stevens–Johnson syndrome (rare), peripheral neuropathy (uncommon) and secondary malignancies (especially acute myeloid leukaemia).
Teniposide	IV	Topoisomerase II inhibitor.	Lymphomas, acute lymphoblastic leukaemia and neuroblastoma	As above.
1.07 Taxanes
Cabazitaxel	IV	Microtubule disassembly inhibitor. Arrests cells in late G2 phase and M phase.	Prostate cancer	Myelosuppression, diarrhoea, kidney failure, hypersensitivity, severe GI reactions (including perforation, ileus, colitis, etc.; all rare) and peripheral neuropathy
Docetaxel	IV	As above.	Breast cancer, non-small cell lung cancer, ovarian cancer, prostate cancer, squamous cell head and neck cancer and gastric cancer.	Myelosuppression, peripheral neuropathy, hypersensitivity, fluid retention, heart failure (uncommon), pulmonary toxicity (rare), radiation recall (rare), scleroderma-like skin changes (rare), Stevens–Johnson syndrome (rare), toxic epidermal necrolysis (rare), seizures (rare) and encephalopathy (rare)
Paclitaxel	IV	As above.	Ovarian cancer, breast cancer, non-small cell lung cancer, AIDS-related Kaposi's sarcoma, cervical cancer, germ cell cancer and endometrial cancer	Hypersensitivity, myelosuppression, peripheral neuropathy, myocardial infarction (uncommon), arrhythmias (uncommon), pulmonary toxicity (rare), radiation recall (rare), scleroderma-like skin changes (rare), Stevens–Johnson syndrome (rare), toxic epidermal necrolysis (rare), seizures (rare) and encephalopathy (rare).
1.08 Vinca alkaloids
Vinblastine	IV	Microtubule assembly inhibitor. Arrests cells in M phase.	Hodgkin lymphoma, germ cell tumours, non-small cell lung cancer, bladder cancer and primary immune thrombocytopenia	Neurotoxicity, myelosuppression, myocardial ischaemia (rare) and myocardial infarction (rare).
Vincristine	IV	As above.	Lymphomas, acute lymphoblastic leukaemia, multiple myeloma, sarcoma, brain tumours, Wilms' tumour, neuroblastoma and primary immune thrombocytopenia	Neurotoxicity, anaphylaxis (rare), myocardial ischaemia (rare) and myocardial infarction (rare).
Vindesine	IV	As above.	Refractory metastatic melanoma, childhood acute lymphoblastic leukaemia, chronic myeloid leukaemia in blast crises, neuroblastoma, non-small cell lung cancer and breast cancer.	Myelosuppression, neurotoxicity and paralytic ileus.
Vinflunine	IV	As above.	Bladder cancer	As per vinblastine.
Vinorelbine	IV	As above.	Breast cancer and non-small cell lung cancer.	As above.
1.09 Alkylating agents
Altretamine	PO	Alkylates DNA.	Recurrent or advanced ovarian cancer	Myelosuppression, peripheral neuropathy, seizures and hepatotoxicity (rare).
Bendamustine	IV	Alkylates DNA.	Chronic lymphocytic leukaemia, mantle cell lymphoma and non-Hodgkin's lymphoma.	Myelosuppression, hypokalaemia and tachycardia.
Busulfan	IV, PO	Alkylates DNA.	Conditioning treatment before haematopoietic stem cell transplantation (high dose, IV), chronic myeloid leukaemia, myelofibrosis, polycythaemia vera and essential thrombocytosis	Myelosuppression, seizures (high dose), tachycardia (high dose), hepatic sinusoidal obstruction syndrome (high dose), Addison-like syndrome (rare), pulmonary fibrosis (rare), cataracts (rare) and hepatitis (rare). Secondary malignancies.
Carmustine	IV	Alkylates DNA.	Anaplastic astrocytoma, glioblastoma multiforme and mycosis fungoides (topical)	Myelosuppression, pulmonary fibrosis, pulmonary infiltrates, seizure, brain oedema, cerebrospinal leaks, subdural fluid collection, intracranial infection, hypotension (uncommon), tachycardia (uncommon), decrease in kidney size (reversible), uraemia (uncommon), kidney failure (uncommon), severe hepatic toxicity (rare), thrombosis (rare) and neuroretinitis (rare). Secondary malignancies.
Chlorambucil	IV	Alkylates DNA.	Lymphoma, chronic lymphocytic leukaemia and Waldenström's macroglobulinaemia	Myelosuppression, hallucinations (rare), seizures (rare), sterile cystitis (rare), hepatotoxicity (rare), severe pneumonitis (rare), Stevens–Johnson syndrome (rare), toxic epidermal necrolysis (rare) and drug fever (rare). Secondary malignancies.
Chlormethine	IV, topical	Alkylates DNA.	Cutaneous T-Cell Lymphoma, metastatic carcinoma, leukaemias, lymphomas, polycythemia vera and bronchogenic carcinoma	Thrombosis, myelosuppression (common), hyperuricaemia, erythema multiforme, haemolytic anaemia, nausea and vomiting (severe) and secondary malignancies.
Cyclophosphamide	IV	Alkylates DNA.	Breast cancer, lymphoma, acute lymphoblastic leukaemia, chronic lymphocytic leukaemia, sarcoma, multiple myeloma, Waldenström's macroglobulinaemia, systemic lupus erythematosus, glomerulonephritis, systemic vasculitis and granulomatosis with polyangiitis	Myelosuppression, nausea and vomiting (>30%), haemorrhagic cystitis, heart failure (rare), pulmonary fibrosis (rare), hepatic sinusoidal obstruction syndrome (rare), water retention resembling SIADH (rare) and seizures (rare). Secondary malignancies.
Dacarbazine	IV	Alkylates DNA.	Hodgkin lymphoma, metastatic malignant melanoma and soft tissue sarcoma	Myelosuppression, agranulocytosis (uncommon), hepatic vein thrombosis (rare) and hepatocellular necrosis (rare). Secondary malignancies.
Fotemustine	IV	Alkylates DNA.	Metastatic malignant melanoma.	Myelosuppression.
Ifosfamide	IV	Alkylates DNA.	Sarcomas, testicular cancer and lymphomas.	Myelosuppression, haemorrhagic cystitis, nephrotoxicity, neurotoxicity and cardiac toxicity (rare). Secondary malignancies.
Lomustine	PO	Alkylates DNA.	Glioma and medulloblastoma.	Myelosuppression, pulmonary infiltration and fibrosis. Secondary malignancies.
Lurbinectedin	IV	Alkylates DNA.	Metastatic small cell lung cancer.	Hepatotoxicity
Mechlorethamine	IV, intra pleural, intra pericardial, topical	Alkylates DNA.	Hodgkin disease, chronic leukimia, lung cancer, polycythemia vera, T-cell lymphoma, mycosia fungoides	Hepatotoxicity (rare)
Melphalan	IV, PO	Alkylates DNA.	Malignant melanoma of the extremities, multiple myeloma, conditioning treatment before haemopoietic stem cell transplant.	Myelosuppression, pulmonary fibrosis and pneumonitis (uncommon), skin necrosis (uncommon), anaphylaxis, hepatic sinusoidal obstruction syndrome and SIADH. Secondary malignancies.
Streptozotocin	IV, PO	Alkylates DNA.	Pancreatic cancer and carcinoid syndrome.	Nephrotoxicity, hypoglycaemia, myelosuppression, nausea and vomiting (>90%), jaundice and nephrogenic diabetes insipidus (rare).
Temozolomide	PO	Alkylates DNA.	Anaplastic astrocytoma, glioblastoma multiforme, metastatic malignant melanoma	Myelosuppression, Stevens–Johnson syndrome (rare), pneumonitis (rare) and hepatitis (rare).
Thiotepa	IV, topical	Alkylates DNA.	Breast, ovarian, and baldder cancer	Myelosupression, embryo-fetal toxicity, hepatotoxicity (rare)
Trabectedin	IV	Alkylates DNA.	Advanced liposarcoma and leimyosarcoma	Bone marrow suppression, rhabdomyolysis, embryo-fetal toxicity, capillary leak syndrome, hepatotoxicity
1.10 Platinum compounds
Carboplatin	IV	Reacts with DNA, inducing apoptosis, non-cell cycle specific.	Ovarian cancer, lung cancer and squamous cell head and neck cancer	Myelosuppression, nausea and vomiting (30-90%), peripheral neuropathy, ototoxicity, anaphylaxis, acute kidney failure (rare), haemolytic uraemic syndrome (rare) and loss of vision (rare).
Cisplatin	IV	Reacts with DNA, inducing apoptosis, non-cell cycle specific.	Germ cell tumours (including testicular cancer), ovarian cancer, cervical cancer, small cell and non-small cell lung cancer, mesothelioma, squamous cell head and neck cancer, oesophageal cancer, gastric cancer, bladder cancer and osteosarcoma	Nephrotoxicity, nausea and vomiting (30-100%), myelosuppression, electrolyte anomalies, peripheral neuropathy, ototoxicity and anaphylaxis, haemolytic anaemia (rare), optic neuritis (rare), reversible posterior leukoencephalopathy syndrome (rare), seizures (rare), ECG changes (rare) and heart failure (rare).
Nedaplatin	IV	Reacts with DNA, inducing apoptosis, non-cell cycle specific.	Non-small cell lung cancer, oesophageal cancer, uterine cervical cancer, head and neck cancer and urothelial cancer	Nephrotoxicity, myelosuppression and nausea and vomiting (30-90%).
Oxaliplatin	IV	Reacts with DNA, inducing apoptosis, non-cell cycle specific.	Colorectal cancer, oesophageal cancer and gastric cancer	Myelosuppression, peripheral neuropathy, anaphylaxis, nausea and vomiting (30-90%), hypokalaemia, metabolic acidosis, interstitial lung disease (uncommon), ototoxicity (rare), reversible posterior leucoencephalopathy syndrome (rare), immune-mediated cytopenias (rare) and hepatic sinusoidal obstruction syndrome (rare).
1.11 Miscellaneous others
Altretamine	PO	Unclear, reactive intermediates covalently bind to microsomal proteins and DNA, possibly causing DNA damage	Recurrent ovarian cancer	Myelosuppression, peripheral neuropathy, seizures and hepatotoxicity (rare).
Bleomycin	IM, SC, IA, IV or IP	Inhibits DNA and to a lesser extent RNA synthesis, produces single and double strand breaks in DNA possibly by free radical formation.	Germ cell tumours, squamous cell carcinoma, pancreatic cancer, non-Hodgkin's, pleural sclerosing and Hodgkin's lymphoma.	Pulmonary toxicity, hypersensitivity, scleroderma and Raynaud's phenomenon.
Bortezomib	IV, SC	Proteasome inhibitor.	Multiple myeloma, mantle cell lymphoma and follicular lymphoma (orphan).	Peripheral neuropathy, neutropenia, thrombocytopenia, anaemia, orthostatic hypotension, hepatitis (uncommon/rare), haemorrhage (uncommon/rare), heart failure (uncommon/rare), seizures (uncommon/rare), progressive multifocal leucoencephalopathy (PML) and hearing loss.
Dactinomycin	IV	Complexes with DNA interfering with DNA-dependent RNA synthesis	Gestational trophoblastic disease, Wilms' tumour and rhabdomyosarcoma	Myelosuppression, anaphylaxis, radiation recall, hepatotoxicity and hepatic sinusoidal obstruction syndrome (common in Wilms' tumour).
Estramustine	PO	Antimicrotubule and oestrogenic actions	Prostate cancer.	Cardiovascular complications, such as ischaemic heart disease, venous thromboembolism, congestive heart failure, pulmonary embolism, myocardial infarction and cerebrovascular failure.
Ixabepilone	IV	Promotes tubulin polymerisation and stabilises microtubular function, causing cell cycle arrest at G2/M phase and subsequently induces apoptosis	Locally advanced or metastatic breast cancer.	Myelosuppression, peripheral neuropathy, myocardial ischaemia (uncommon/rare), supraventricular arrhythmia (uncommon/rare) and hypersensitivity reaction (uncommon/rare).
Mitomycin	IV	Cross-links DNA	Anal, bladder, and upper tract urothelial cancers	Myelosuppression, pulmonary toxicity and haemolytic uraemic syndrome (rare).
Plicamycin	IV	Blocks RNA synthesis	Testicular and germ cell cancers	Hepatotoxicity, Bone marrow suppression
Procarbazine	IM, IV	Inhibits DNA, RNA and protein synthesis.	Glioma and Hodgkin's lymphoma.	Myelosuppression, neurotoxicity, pulmonary fibrosis (uncommon/rare), pneumonitis (uncommon/rare), haemolysis (uncommon/rare) and hepatic dysfunction (uncommon/rare).
2. Targeted antineoplastics
2.1 Monoclonal antibodies
Alemtuzumab	IV	CD52 antibody induces apoptosis in the tagged cells.	Chronic lymphocytic leukaemia	Pancytopenia, pneumonitis, arrhythmias and hypersensitivity reactions (rare), autoimmune haemolytic anaemia (rare), autoimmune thrombocytopenia (rare) and progressive multifocal leucoencephalopathy (rare).
Bevacizumab	IV	VEGF inhibitor.	Colorectal, breast, ovarian, renal cell and non-squamous non-small cell lung cancer and glioblastoma	Hypertension, thromboembolisms, heart failure, bleeding, neutropenia, thrombocytopenia, GI perforation, fistula formation, hypertensive encephalopathy, pulmonary hypertension, reversible posterior leucoencephalopathy syndrome, nasal septum perforation and osteonecrosis of the jaw.
Cetuximab	IV	EGFR inhibitor.	Squamous cell head and neck cancer or EGFR-positive and KRAS wild-type metastatic colorectal cancer.	Infusion-related reactions, skin reactions, hypomagnesaemia, hypocalcaemia, hypokalaemia, blood clots, interstitial lung disease and aseptic meningitis.
Denosumab	SC	RANKL inhibitor.	Osteoporosis, including drug- and cancer-related osteoporosis, giant cell tumour of bone and hypercalcaemia of malignancies	Hypercholesterolaemia, cataract, urinary retention, hypocalcaemia, osteonecrosis of the jaw and anaphylaxis.
Gemtuzumab ozogamicin	IV	CD33 antibody that induces apoptosis of the tagged cell.	Acute myeloid leukaemia	Hepatic veno-occlusive disease, myelosuppression, cytokine release syndrome, hypersensitivity and electrolyte anomalies.
Ibritumomab tiuxetan	IV	CD20 antibody bound with the radioactive isotope, 90Y, induces radiation-dependent cell lysis.	Non-Hodgkin's lymphoma and follicular lymphoma.	Thrombocytopenia, neutropenia, anaemia, hypotension and secondary malignancies.
Ipilimumab	IV	CTLA4 antibody that causes immune system-mediated lysis of the tagged cell	Unresectable or metastatic malignant melanoma.	Life-threatening immune mediated reactions and fever.
Nivolumab	IV	IgG4 antibody that functions as a checkpoint inhibitor, specifically inhibiting PD-1	Melanoma, lung cancer, malignant pleural mesothelioma, renal cell carcinoma, Hodgkin lymphoma, head and neck cancer, urothelial carcinoma, colon cancer, esophageal squamous cell carcinoma, liver cancer, gastric cancer, and esophageal or gastroesophageal junction (GEJ) cancer.	Fatigue, rash, musculoskeletal pain, itching, diarrhea, nausea, asthenia, cough, shortness of breath, constipation, decreased appetite, back pain, joint pain, upper respiratory tract infection, abnormal temperature increases, headache, abdominal pain, and vomiting.
Ofatumumab	IV	Anti-CD20 antibody.	Chronic lymphocytic leukaemia	Neutropenia, pneumonia, infusion reactions, cytopenias
Panitumumab	IV	EGFR inhibitor.	RAS (KRAS or NRAS) wild-type metastatic colorectal cancer	Skin reactions, electrolyte anomalies, anaphylaxis and angiooedema (rare).
Pembrolizumab	IV	Anti-PD-1 monoclonal antibody.	Melanoma, lung cancer, head and neck cancer, Hodgkin lymphoma, and stomach cancer.	Fatigue, rash, itchiness (pruritus), diarrhea, nausea, joint pain (arthralgia).
Pertuzumab	IV	HER2 inhibitor.	HER2-positive breast cancer.	Anaphylaxis, cardiac dysfunction and anaemia.
Rituximab	IV	Anti-CD20 antibody.	CD20-positive B cell non-Hodgkin lymphoma, chronic lymphocytic leukaemia, rheumatoid arthritis, granulomatosis with polyangiitis and microscopic polyangiitis	Infusion-related reactions, neutropenia, arrhythmias, infection, thrombocytopenia (uncommon), anaemia (uncommon), angina (uncommon), myocardial infarction (uncommon), heart failure (uncommon), haemolytic anaemia (rare), aplastic anaemia (rare), serum sickness (rare), severe skin conditions (rare), pulmonary infiltrates (rare), pneumonitis (rare), cranial neuropathy (vision or hearing loss; rare) and progressive multifocal leucoencephalopathy (rare).
Tositumomab	IV	Anti-CD20 antibody which is tagged with I131.	Non-Hodgkin's lymphoma	Grade 3-4 cytopenias, methaemoglobinaemia, acute myeloid leukaemia or myelodysplastic syndrome, anaphylaxis and hyperthyroidism.
Trastuzumab	IV	Anti-HER2 antibody.	HER2-positive breast cancer, gastric cancer, pancreatic cancer (orphan) and gastro-oesophageal junction cancer.	Cardiac dysfunction, infusion-related reactions, peripheral neuropathy and pulmonary toxicity (rare).
2.2 Tyrosine kinase inhibitor
Afatinib	PO	EGFR, HER2 and HER4 inhibitor.	Non-small cell lung cancer.	Diarrhoea, hypokalaemia, interstitial lung disease and hepatotoxicity.
Aflibercept	IV	VEGF and PGF inhibitor.	Colorectal cancer.	Myelosuppression, hypertension, dehydration, blood clots, GI perforation and reversible posterior leucoencephalopathy syndrome (uncommon).
Axitinib	PO	Multikinase inhibitor.	Renal cell carcinoma	Hypertension, thyroid dysfunction, blood clots, electrolyte disturbances, GI perforation (rare), fistula formation (rare), reversible posterior leucoencephalopathy syndrome (rare) and polycythaemia (uncommon).
Bosutinib	PO	Bcr-Abl and SRc kinase inhibitor.	Chronic myeloid leukaemia	Diarrhoea, thrombocytopenia, neutropenia, hepatotoxicity, QT interval prolongation, kidney failure, pleural effusion, pericarditis (uncommon/rare), acute pancreatitis (uncommon/rare), GI haemorrhage (uncommon/rare), anaphylactic shock (uncommon/rare), acute pulmonary oedema (uncommon/rare), respiratory failure (uncommon/rare), pulmonary hypertension (uncommon/rare) and erythema multiforme (uncommon/rare).
Crizotinib	PO	ALK, Hepatocyte Growth Factor Receptor (HGFR, c-Met), and Recepteur d'Origine Nantais (RON) inhibitor.	Non-small cell lung cancer	Lymphopenia, neutropenia, hypophosphataemia, hypokalaemia, peripheral neuropathy, blood clots, QT interval prolongation, bradycardia, pneumonia, pneumonitis, kidney cyst, ARDS and liver failure.
Dasatinib	PO	BCR-ABL, SRC family, c-Kit, EPHA2 and PDGFR-β kinase inhibitor.	Philadelphia positive chronic myeloid leukaemia and acute lymphoblastic leukaemia.	Fluid retention, myelosuppression, haemorrhage, hypertension, electrolyte anomalies, cardiac dysfunction (rare), heart failure (rare), myocardial infarction, arrhythmia (rare), prolonged QT interval (rare), kidney failure (rare), hypersensitivity (rare) and hepatic failure (rare).
Erlotinib	PO	EGFR inhibitor.	Non-small cell lung cancer and pancreatic cancer.	Skin reactions, diarrhoea, GI bleeds, anaemia, dehydration, interstitial lung disease (uncommon), hepatic failure (rare), hepatorenal syndrome (rare), GI perforation (rare) and ulcerative keratitis (rare).
Gefitinib	PO	EGFR inhibitor.	EGFR-mutation positive non-small cell lung cancer.	Skin reactions, diarrhoea, dehydration, haemorrhage, interstitial lung disease (uncommon), pancreatitis (uncommon), hepatitis (uncommon), allergy (uncommon), hepatic failure (rare), toxic epidermal necrolysis (rare) and Stevens–Johnson syndrome (rare).
Imatinib	PO	Bcr-Abl kinase inhibitor.	Philadelphia chromosome-positive acute lymphoblastic leukaemia, chronic myeloid leukaemia, GI stromal tumour and myelodysplastic/myeloproliferative diseases.	Myelosuppression, fluid retention, GI bleeding, electrolyte anomalies, left ventricular dysfunction (uncommon), heart failure (uncommon), pulmonary oedema (uncommon), kidney failure (uncommon), angiooedema (rare), anaphylaxis (rare), GI perforation (rare), hepatotoxicity (rare), avascular necrosis (rare), myopathy (rare) and rhabdomyolysis (rare).
Lapatinib	PO	HER2 inhibitor.	HER2-positive breast cancer, stomach cancer (orphan) and oesophageal cancer (orphan).	Diarrhoea, interstitial lung disease (uncommon), hepatotoxicity (uncommon) and anaphylaxis (rare).
Nilotinib	PO	Bcr-Abl kinase inhibitor.	Chronic myeloid leukaemia.	Myelosuppression, electrolyte disturbances, hyperglycaemia, prolonged QT interval (uncommon), peripheral arterial occlusive disease (uncommon), pancreatitis (uncommon), pleural effusion (uncommon) and pericardial effusion (uncommon).
Pazopanib	PO	Multikinase inhibitor, including c-KIT, FGFR, PDGFR and VEGFR.	Renal cell carcinoma and soft tissue sarcoma.	Hypertension, QT interval prolongation, haemorrhage, blood clots, neutropenia, thrombocytopenia, neutropenia, thrombocytopenia, elevated thyroid-stimulating hormone, hypothyroidism, electrolyte disturbances, hypo- or hyperglycaemia, torsades de pointes (uncommon), heart failure (uncommon), hepatic failure (uncommon), GI perforation (uncommon), fistula formation (uncommon) and reversible posterior leucoencephalopathy syndrome (rare).
Ponatinib	PO	Multikinase inhibitor (BEGFR, PDGFR, FGFR, EPH receptors and SRC families of kinases, and KIT, RET, TIE2 and FLT3), that also inhibits T135I Bcr-Abl kinase.	T135I positive Chronic myeloid leukaemia and Philadelphia chromosome positive acute lymphoblastic leukaemia.	Hypertension, neutropenia, leucopenia, anaemia, thrombocytopenia, lymphopenia, pleural effusion, heart failure, peripheral neuropathy, haemorrhage, blood clots, pancreatitis and infection.
Regorafenib	PO	Multikinase inhibitor for RET, VEGFR1, VEGFR2, VEGFR3, KIT, PDGFR-alpha, PDGFR-beta, FGFR1, FGFR2, TIE2, DDR2, Trk2A, Eph2A, RAF-1, BRAF, BRAFV600E, SAPK2, PTK5, and Bcr-Abl.	Colorectal cancer and GI stromal tumours.	Anaemia, lymphopenia, thrombocytopenia, electrolyte anomalies, hepatotoxicity, hypertension, hypothyroidism, neutropenia, myocardial ischaemia or infarction.
Ruxolitinib	PO	JAK1 and JAK2 inhibitor.	Myelofibrosis and pancreatic cancer (orphan).	Anaemia and thrombocytopenia.
Sorafenib	PO	Multikinase inhibitor (including VEGF and PDGF receptor kinases).	Renal cell carcinoma and hepatocellular carcinoma.	Hypertension, skin reactions, bleeding, neutropenia, thrombocytopenia, lymphopenia, peripheral neuropathy, thyroid dysfunction, electrolyte anomalies, myocardial ischaemia or infarctions, heart failure (uncommon), GI perforation (uncommon), pancreatitis (uncommon), reversible posterior leucoencephalopathy syndrome (rare), hepatitis (rare), nephrotic syndrome (rare) and prolonged QT interval (rare).
Sunitinib	PO	Multikinase inhibitor (including VEGF & PDGF receptor tyrosine kinases)	renal cell carcinoma, GI stromal tumour and pancreatic neuroendocrine tumour	Neutropenia, thrombocytopenia, lymphopenia, hypertension, left ventricular dysfunction, heart failure, blood clots, thyroid dysfunction, electrolyte anomalies, pancreatitis (uncommon), hepatic failure (uncommon), prolonged QT interval (rare), torsades de pointes (rare), GI perforation (rare), fistula formation (rare), seizures (rare), reversible posterior leucoencephalopathy syndrome (rare), haemolytic uraemic syndrome (rare), thrombotic thrombocytopenic purpura (rare), nephrotic syndrome (rare), hypersensitivity (rare), angiooedema (rare), toxic epidermal necrolysis (rare) and Stevens–Johnson syndrome (rare).
Vandetanib	PO	Tyrosine kinase inhibitor (TKI) with selective activity against RET, VEGFR-2 and EGFR	Medullary thyroid cancer.	Diarrhoea, hypertension, QT interval prolongation, depression, electrolyte anomalies, hypothyroidism and GI perforation (uncommon).
2.3 mTOR inhibitors
Everolimus	PO	mTOR inhibitor.	Renal cell cancer, pancreatic neuroendocrine tumour and breast cancer	Pleural effusion, hyperglycaemia, hypercholesterolaemia, hypertriglyceridaemia, neutropenia, lymphopenia, thrombocytopenia, anaemia, bleeding, kidney failure, hypokalaemia, hypophosphataemia, pneumonitis, impaired wound healing (uncommon), anaphylaxis (rare) and angiooedema (rare).
Temsirolimus	IV	mTOR inhibitor.	Renal cell cancer and mantle cell lymphoma.	Infusion reactions, impaired wound healing, hyperglycaemia, hypercholesterolaemia, hypertriglyceridaemia, neutropenia, lymphopenia, thrombocytopenia, anaemia, bleeding, kidney failure, hypokalaemia, hypophosphataemia, pneumonitis, bowel perforation (uncommon) and intracerebral bleeding and Stevens–Johnson syndrome (rare).
2.4 Retinoids
Alitretinoin	Topical	Retinoic acid receptor (RAR) and retinoid X receptor (RXR) agonist.	Kaposi's sarcoma.	Oedema, rashes
Bexarotene	PO, topical	RXR agonist.	Cutaneous T cell lymphoma	Leucopenia, anaemia, lactic dehydrogenase increased, hypochromic anaemia, hyperlipidaemia, hypercholesteraemia, hypothyroidism, haemorrhage, hypertension and kidney dysfunction.
Isotretinoin	PO, topical	RXR & RAR agonist.	Neuroblastoma and acne.	Topical: Skin reactions, blood lipid anomalies, increased platelet count and osteoporosis. Oral: Anaemia, Red blood cell sedimentation rate increased, thrombocytopenia, thrombocytosis, neutropenia, anaphylaxis, hypersensitivity, diabetes mellitus, hyperuricaemia, psychiatric disturbances (rare), convulsions (very rare), conjunctivitis, vasculitis (very rare), GI haemorrhage (very rare), hepatitis (very rare), erythema multiforme, Stevens–Johnson syndrome, toxic epidermal necrolysis, arthritis (very rare), rhabdomyolysis and glomerulonephritis (very rare).
Tamibarotene	PO	RAR agonist.	Refractory acute promyelocytic leukaemia and Alzheimer's disease.	Hypercholesterolaemia, hypertriglyceridaemia, gastrointestinal disturbances, liver damage, leucocytosis and differentiation syndrome.
Tretinoin	PO, topical	RXR & RAR agonist.	Acne and acute promyelocytic leukaemia.	Oral: Differentiation syndrome, hyperleucocytosis, elevated cholesterol and triglycerides, arrhythmias, pancreatitis, elevated liver enzymes, thrombosis, intracranial hypertension and pseudotumour cerebri (mainly in children), anxiety, depression and genital ulceration (rare). Topical: Erythema.
2.4 Immunomodulatory Agents (IMiDs)
Lenalidomide	PO	Numerous actions; anti-angiogenesis (via inhibition of VEGF release), anti-TNF, IL-6 and pro-IL-2, IFN-γ effects. Also stimulates T cells and apoptosis in cancer cells.	Multiple myeloma	Blood clots, neutropenia (dose-limiting), thrombocytopenia (dose-limiting), anaemia, infection, hypotension, hypokalaemia, hypothyroidism, Stevens–Johnson syndrome, toxic epidermal necrolysis, angioedema, pneumonitis, hepatotoxicity and secondary malignancies (mostly myelodysplastic syndrome and acute myeloid leukaemia).
Pomalidomide	PO	As above.	Multiple myeloma and systemic sclerosis (orphan).	Neutropenia, anaemia, pneumonia, thrombocytopenia, hypercalcaemia, hyperglycaemia, kidney failure, lymphopenia, hyponatraemia, hypocalcaemia, hypokalaemia, peripheral neuropathy and thromboembolism.
Thalidomide	PO	As above.	Multiple myeloma, erythema nodosum leprosum and the following orphan indications: graft versus host disease, mycobacterial infection, recurrent aphthous ulcers, severe recurrent aphthous stomatitis, primary brain malignancies, HIV-associated wasting syndrome, Crohn's disease, Kaposi's sarcoma, myelodysplastic syndrome and haematopoietic stem cell transplantation.	Peripheral neuropathy, depression, thromboembolism, bradycardia, orthostatic hypotension, leucopenia, hypothyroidism, thrombocytopenia (uncommon), Stevens–Johnson syndrome (rare), toxic epidermal necrolysis (rare), pneumonitis (rare), hepatotoxicity (rare) and hearing loss (rare).
2.5 Histone deacetylase inhibitors
Panobinostat	add	add	add	add
Romidepsin	IV	Histone deacetylase inhibitor, hence inducing alterations in gene expression in the affected cells.	Peripheral and cutaneous T cell lymphoma.	Electrolyte anomalies, anaemia, thrombocytopenia, neutropenia, lymphopenia and ECG anomalies.
Valproate (Note: Its use in cancer treatment is purely investigational at present)	PO, IV	As above.	Migraine prophylaxis, mania, epilepsy, fragile X syndrome (orphan), familial adenomatous polyposis (orphan) and the following off-label uses: cervical cancer, melanoma, mesothelioma, acute myeloid leukaemia and myelodysplastic syndrome.	Hyperammonaemia, thrombocytopenia, polycystic ovaries, SIADH (uncommon), hepatic failure (rare), pancreatitis (rare), leucopenia (rare), neutropenia (rare), pure red cell aplasia (rare), agranulocytosis (rare), extrapyramidal syndrome (rare), reduced BMD with long-term use, pleural effusion (rare) and multiorgan hypersensitivity reaction (rare).
Vorinostat	PO	As above.	As per romidepsin.	Thrombocytopenia, anaemia, QT interval prolongation and pulmonary embolism.
2.6 Other Agents
Anagrelide	PO	Phosphodiesterase 3 inhibitor.	Essential thrombocythaemia	Fluid retention, palpitations, tachycardia, hepatotoxicity (uncommon), heart failure (uncommon), hypertension (uncommon), arrhythmia (uncommon), syncope (uncommon), cardiomyopathy (rare), cardiomegaly (rare), MI (rare), pulmonary hypertension (rare), interstitial lung disease (rare) and pancreatitis (rare).
Arsenic trioxide (Note: There is no INN for arsenic trioxide, just the USAN)	IV	Not fully understood. Induces partial differentiation and promotes apoptosis of leukaemic cells and may also inhibit angiogenesis.	Refractory or relapsed acute promyelocytic leukaemia. Orphan indications include: acute myeloid leukaemia, chronic lymphocytic leukaemia, malignant glioma, myelodysplastic syndrome, multiple myeloma, liver cancer and chronic myeloid leukaemia.	Differentiation syndrome, hyperleucocytosis, neutropenia, thrombocytopenia, ventricular tachycardia, prolonged QT interval, torsades de pointes, complete atrioventricular block, peripheral neuropathy, hyperglycaemia, hypokalaemia, hypomagnesaemia, elevation of bilirubin or aminotransferases, hepatotoxicity and secondary malignancies.
Asparaginase (Note: There is no INN for asparaginase, only a USAN)	IM, IV	Catalyses the conversion of the amino acid L-asparagine to aspartic acid and thereby reduces the availability of L-asparagine to leukaemic cells. Unlike normal cells, certain types of leukaemic cells do not synthesise L-asparagine, which is essential for cell growth and survival.	Acute lymphoblastic leukaemia and lymphoblastic lymphoma.	Allergic reactions, haemorrhagic and thrombotic events, uraemia, pancreatitis, hyperglycaemia, hyperammonaemia, acute kidney failure and diabetic ketoacidosis.
BCG vaccine (Note: There is no INN for BCG)	IB	Live, attenuated Mycobacterium bovis, which produces a local inflammatory reaction, resulting in elimination or reduction of superficial tumour lesions of the bladder.	Bladder cancer	Cystitis, BCG infection and contracted bladder.
Denileukin diftitox	IV	Interleukin 2 combined with diphtheria toxin which binds to the interleukin receptor on immune cells and introduces the diphtheria toxin into the cell.	Cutaneous T cell lymphoma and peripheral T cell lymphoma (orphan).	Infusion reactions, hypocalcaemia, hypotension, thrombocytopenia, Acute kidney injury (uncommon/rare), Hyper/hypothyroidism (uncommon/rare), pancreatitis (uncommon/rare) and toxic epidermal necrolysis (uncommon/rare).
Vemurafenib	PO	BRAF kinase inhibitor.	BRAF kinase mutation V600E-positive Metastatic melanoma.	Skin reactions, secondary malignancies (mostly squamous cell carcinoma), anaphylaxis (rare) and hypotension (rare).
Abbreviations/Acronyms: IM – Intramuscular. IV – Intravenous. IA – Intra-arterial. SC – Subcutaneous. PO – Per os, oral. IP – Intrapleural. IB – Intrabladder. Preg. cat. - Pregnancy category. The preferred pregnancy category is Australian, but if it is unavailable the pregnancy category given is American.
