= Medicine shortage in Iran =

Health crisis in Iran

There have been shortages of many essential drugs in Iran, a crisis that began around 2013. The crisis intensified in 2022 when Ebrahim Raisi’s administration removed the 42,000-rial exchange rate for the US dollar. Also in 2022, the Iranian government halted subsidies for the production of food and medicine, causing imported raw materials to cost seven times the price, thereby crippling domestic production of medicines. In the same year, the prices of essential drugs in the country were predicted to reach the 700% inflation mark.

== Causes ==
The Food and Drug Organization of Iran has reported shortages of many essential drugs in the country. Reports of the crisis began emerging in 2013. The crisis intensified in 2022 when Ebrahim Raisi’s administration removed the 42,000-rial exchange rate for the US dollar. Inflation further compounds the issue.

In 2022, the Iranian government under Ebrahim Raisi halted the subsidies for the production of food and medicine, forcing producers to pay seven times more for the import of raw materials, thereby crippling domestic production of medicines. This has caused a severe shortage in essential pharmaceutical products in local medical establishments, although the regime's pharmaceutical companies have continued to increase their profits by the production of sports supplements. In 2022, the Iranian Labour News Agency quoted Bahram Daraei, the regime’s head of the Iranian food and drug organization, as saying that the price increase of imported drugs was up to 6 times its original cost "and domestically produced drugs increased in price by 30 to 100 percent, depending on the amount of raw material supply currency". Both Iranian media and government officials have predicted that drug prices will continue to climb up to 700 percent. The rising medical costs for Iranian consumers has pushed thousands of those in need of treatment to the brink of bankruptcy. The shortage of medicine resulting from the price increase includes basic medical necessities, such as painkillers, IV fluids, antibiotics, anti-anxiety medication, Alendronic (bone density) and Omeprazole (stomach issues), as well as medicines with higher stakes, such as insulin, medications for asthma and Chronic Obstructive Pulmonary Disease (COPD), Melphalan and Thiotepa (chemotherapy), Factor 8 (haemophilia), Interferon Beta and Diphosel (Multiple Sclerosis).

In some provinces, even locally produced medications are unavailable. The pharmaceutical sector experienced the second biggest production decline among all industries, with a 2.6% fall in production of pharmaceutical products in the spring and 18.5% in the summer, with other sources indicating that the total fall in production is about 30%. Some pharmaceutical companies have relocated from Iran to other countries.

Furthermore, there has been a 13.6% decrease in medicine imports. In addition, a shortage of imported raw materials used for producing medicines further contributes to the lack of local production. The Iranian Ministry of Health has said that they are preparing to address these issues, but have not given more specific details.

Many have blamed the medicine shortages on sanctions and restrictions on financial transactions imposed by the US and European countries, although the western nations say that medical supplies are not included in the sanctions. However, the Iranian government says pharmaceutical needs are almost entirely met by domestic producers and thus not affected by sanctions. But even if this is true, many argue that the sanctions have dramatically increased costs and the risk to patients, and some claim that the US humanitarian exemptions exist on paper but not in practice. This had led to some patients filing a lawsuit again the US government, alleging that "unfair sanctions" have obstructed their access to medicines.

== Impact ==
The Iranian Thalassaemia Society claims that some 1,100 thalassaemia patients have died due to drug shortages since the beginning of the crisis in 2018.

In 2023, the Iranian government allocated approximately $2.4 billion to solving the crisis, although Hossein-Ali Shahriari, head of the Iranian parliamentary Health Commission, wrote a letter to then-President Ebrahim Raeisi saying that the budget need to be increased to approximately $3.7 billion in order to help the situation.

In 2024, the Health and Treatment Commission of Iran's parliament urged legal action to address the issues and the proposed referring government violations to the judiciary, but the majority of the parliament voted to keep the issue within the legislative branch.

Regime-linked entities have been making profits selling medicines at exorbitant prices and leaving pharmacies with shortages. Some medicines are trafficked on the black market to neighboring countries. Some even claim that the issue is not per-se a medicine shortage, as the government is theoretically able to import and produce all the medications needed, but the problem is that corruption and nepotism cause the medicines to not be distributed to those who need them. Some even argue that the crisis was intentionally playing up medical shortages in order to get financial lifelines from western countries. It has also been reported that Iran limits drug quotas of pharmacies that do not require their female employees to war Hijabs. In 2023, The Iran News Update quoted a 2022 report from the Iranian Statistics Center reinforcing the statement that the regime's policies have made adequate healthcare a commodity that only wealthy families can afford. As a result of the new policies, low-income families face severe difficulties in obtaining essential medications and a large segment of the population, including many senior citizens, has resorted to the dangerous trend of self-treatment. According to a report in the Hammihan newspaper, because of the soaring medical expenses, many people refuse hospital treatment or they leave the hospital before paying for the medications they had received.

== The rise of alternative medicine ==
As a result of the lack of necessary medicines, some government officials have pushed alternative medicine, encouraging people to use unproven remedies and to disregard scientific evidence. For example, "medical experts" in Iran encouraged followers to sip hot camel urine or to drop bitter watermelon oil into your ears to ward of COVID-19, rather than taking the vaccine. The Iranian ministry of health announced in June 2020 that all medical students should take modules on Islamic or traditional medicine. In 2020, a group of doctors denounced the alternative methods, and called for their total elimination.
