= C9H11FN2O5 =

The molecular formula C_{9}H_{11}FN_{2}O_{5} may refer to:

- Doxifluridine, a second generation nucleoside analog
- Floxuridine, an antimetabolite oncology drug
