= C12H13N3O2 =

The molecular formula C_{12}H_{13}N_{3}O_{2} (molar mass : 231.25 g/mol) may refer to:

- Farampator
- Isocarboxazid
- Triaziquone, a drug used in chemotherapy
