= Triethylenemelamine =

Chemical compound

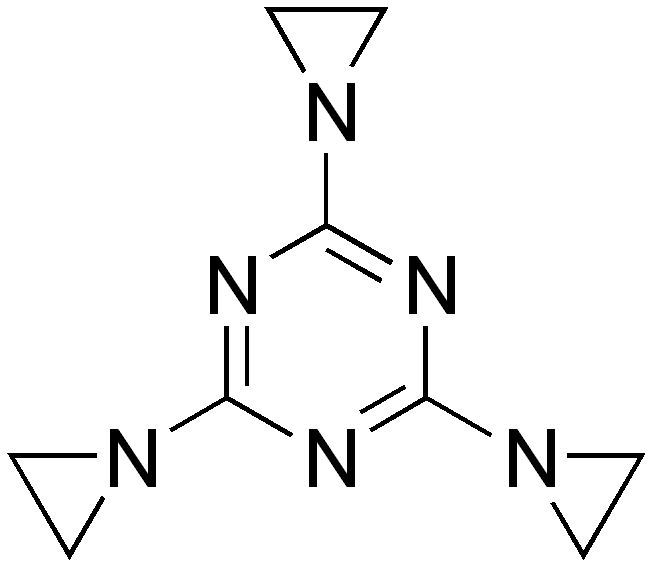

Clinical data
- ATC code: None

Identifiers
- IUPAC name: 2,4,6-Tris(aziridin-1-yl)-1,3,5-triazine
- CAS Number: 51-18-3
- PubChem CID: 5799
- ChemSpider: 5594
- UNII: F7IY6HZG9D
- KEGG: C07642
- ChEMBL: ChEMBL502384
- CompTox Dashboard (EPA): DTXSID3026225
- ECHA InfoCard: 100.000.076

Chemical and physical data
- Formula: C_{9}H_{12}N_{6}
- Molar mass: 204.237 g·mol^{−1}
- 3D model (JSmol): Interactive image
- SMILES: C1CN1c2nc(nc(n2)N3CC3)N4CC4
- InChI: InChI=1S/C9H12N6/c1-2-13(1)7-10-8(14-3-4-14)12-9(11-7)15-5-6-15/h1-6H2; Key:IUCJMVBFZDHPDX-UHFFFAOYSA-N

Triethylenemelamine (abbreviated TEM, also called Tretamine) is a drug used in chemotherapy.

It is a mutagenic chemical because it is an alkylating antineoplastic agent, a trifunctional alkylating agent that has three reactive groups that enable it to bind covalently to DNA at three distinct sites. As a result, TEM can cause chromatid aberrations in cell models. It was one of the first compounds used for chemical mutagenesis in laboratory mice, with the impact on mutagenesis measured by the specific-locus test by Bruce Cattanach.

== See also ==
- Altretamine
- Thiotepa
