= Retinoic acid syndrome =

- Other names: Differentiation syndrome
- Specialty: Oncology, hematology

Retinoic acid syndrome (RAS) is a potentially life-threatening complication observed in people with acute promyelocytic leukemia (APML) and first thought to be specifically associated with all-trans retinoic acid (ATRA) (also known as tretinoin) treatment. Subsequently, so-called RAS was recognized in APML patients who had been treated with another highly efficacious drug, arsenic trioxide, and yet did not appear in patients treated with tretinoin for other disorders. These facts and others support the notion that RAS depends on the presence of the malignant promyelocytes. This has led to the growing deprecation of the term 'retinoic acid syndrome' and to an increasing use of the term differentiation syndrome to signify this APML treatment complication.

== Signs and symptoms ==
The syndrome is characterized by dyspnea, fever, weight gain, hypotension, and pulmonary infiltrates. This is effectively treated by giving dexamethasone and withholding ATRA (or arsenic trioxide) in severe cases. An elevated white count is sometimes associated with this syndrome, but is not always pathognomonic.

Once RAS has resolved, pro-differentiation chemotherapy can be resumed.

== Causes ==
The cause of RAS is not clear. Several causes have been speculated, including a capillary leak syndrome from cytokine release from the differentiating myeloid cells. Alternatively, ATRA may cause the maturing myeloid cells to acquire the ability to infiltrate organs such as the lung.

Mediation by cathepsin G has been suggested.

== Treatment ==
The treatment of RAS usually involves administering dexamethasone IV, with the dosage usually 10 mg twice a day for 10 days. It is important for patients to discontinue the use of tretinoin due to the elevation of white blood cells and possible low blood oxygen.

== See also ==
- Hypervitaminosis A
