= Carboquone =

Chemical compound

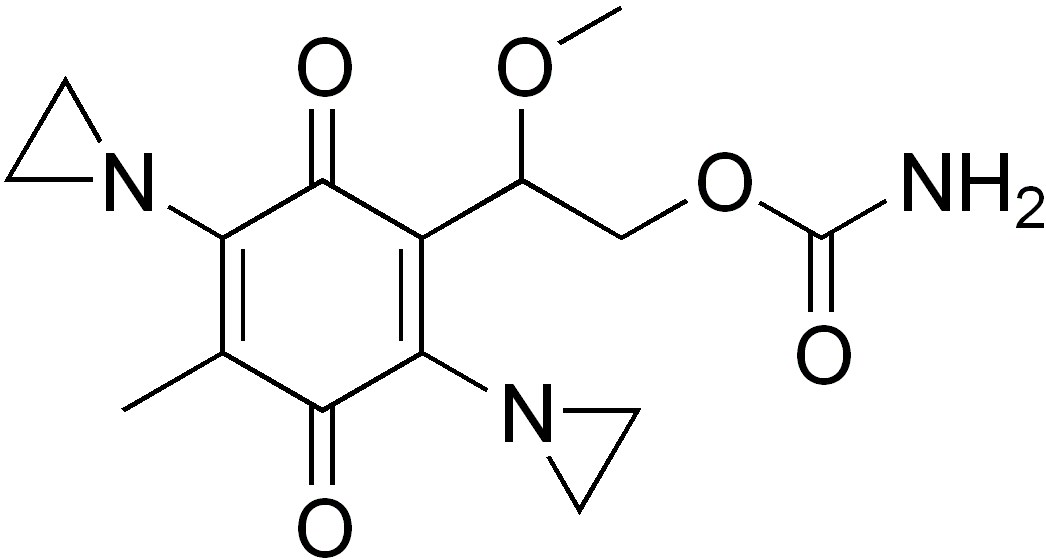

Clinical data
- ATC code: L01AC03 (WHO)

Identifiers
- IUPAC name: {2-[2,5-bis(aziridin-1-yl)-4-methyl-3,6-dioxocyclohexa-1,4-dien-1-yl]-2-methoxyethyl} carbamate
- CAS Number: 24279-91-2
- PubChem CID: 2569
- ChemSpider: 2471
- UNII: 1CB0HBT12C
- ChEMBL: ChEMBL443014
- CompTox Dashboard (EPA): DTXSID8046870

Chemical and physical data
- Formula: C_{15}H_{19}N_{3}O_{5}
- Molar mass: 321.333 g·mol^{−1}
- 3D model (JSmol): Interactive image
- SMILES: O=C(OCC(OC)C=1C(=O)\C(=C(/C(=O)C=1N2CC2)C)N3CC3)N
- InChI: InChI=1S/C15H19N3O5/c1-8-11(17-3-4-17)14(20)10(9(22-2)7-23-15(16)21)12(13(8)19)18-5-6-18/h9H,3-7H2,1-2H3,(H2,16,21); Key:SHHKQEUPHAENFK-UHFFFAOYSA-N

Carboquone is a drug used in chemotherapy.

== See also ==
- Chemotherapy
- Aziridine
