= Semustine =

Chemical compound

Clinical data
- ATC code: L01AD03 (WHO)

Identifiers
- IUPAC name: 1-(2-Chloroethyl)-3-(4-methylcyclohexyl)-1-nitrosourea
- CAS Number: 13909-09-6
- PubChem CID: 5198
- ChemSpider: 5009
- UNII: 6YY7T1T567
- KEGG: D05822
- ChEBI: CHEBI:6863
- CompTox Dashboard (EPA): DTXSID8031603
- ECHA InfoCard: 100.162.271

Chemical and physical data
- Formula: C_{10}H_{18}ClN_{3}O_{2}
- Molar mass: 247.72 g·mol^{−1}
- 3D model (JSmol): Interactive image
- SMILES: CC1CCC(CC1)NC(=O)N(CCCl)N=O
- InChI: InChI=1S/C10H18ClN3O2/c1-8-2-4-9(5-3-8)12-10(15)14(13-16)7-6-11/h8-9H,2-7H2,1H3,(H,12,15); Key:FVLVBPDQNARYJU-UHFFFAOYSA-N

Semustine (1-(2-chloroethyl)-3-(trans-4-methylcyclohexyl)-1-nitrosourea, MeCCNU) is an alkylating nitrosourea compound used in chemotherapy treatment of various types of tumours. Due to its lipophilic property, semustine can cross the blood-brain barrier for the chemotherapy of brain tumours, where it interferes with DNA replication in the rapidly-dividing tumour cells. Semustine, just as lomustine, is administered orally. Evidence has been found that treatment with semustine can cause acute leukaemia as a delayed effect in very rare cases.

== Structure and reactivity ==
Semustine (Me-CCNU) is an organochlorine compound that is urea in which the two hydrogens on one of the amino groups are replaced by nitroso and 2-chloroetyl groups and one hydrogen from the other amino group is replaced by a 4-methylcyclohexcyl group. Semustine is also known as a 4-methyl derivative of lomustine.

== Synthesis ==
The synthesis of semustine originates from a systematic synthesis scheme revolving around N-Nitrosourea compounds. Phosgene is reacted with aziridine to produce the chemical intermediate di(aziridin-1-yl) methanone. This reacts with the subsequently released HCl from the production of the intermediate to open the Aziridine rings and it will form 1,3-bis(2-chloroethyl)-urea. The next step is to nitrosate this compound with the sodium nitrite in formic acid. This will give one of the nitrogen’s a nitroso functional group. With this step carmustine (BCNU), another medication used for chemotherapy, is formed. BCNU is subsequently decomposed in the presence of 4-Methylcyclohexylamine. The aliphatic amine is in two equivalents present during the decomposition. During the decomposition, the compound loses its nitroso group and only one methyl cyclohexyl group will be found on the compound. The final step is to repeat the nitrosation of the compound under the same conditions and Semustine (Me-CCNU) is synthesised. This whole synthesis is shown in Figure 1.

More recent studies suggest using 1-chloro-2-isocyanatoethyl as a starting material alongside cyclohexylamine. For this, TEA can be used as a catalyst to get to the same final step as the previously mentioned synthesis route. In this final step, the nitrosation can be done again with sodium nitrite (1) or with tert-butyl nitrite (2). In this synthesis R = H, CH3 or OH. This whole synthesis is shown in Figure 2.

== Available forms ==
Since the synthesis yields a stable substance, this compound is usually delivered as pure substance and not as a salt. When supplied as medicine, the most common forms of administration are pills with a range from 3.0 to 100 mg semustine per pill.

== Mechanism of action ==
DNA is the most significant part of the cell, performing the most important processes, replication, and transcription. These processes and DNA itself can be targeted with small molecules or ligands with possible antitumor activity, resulting in prevention of continuous growth and proliferating of cancer cells. The common property of alkylating agents, including semustine, is their capacity to become very strong electrophiles through the formation of (chloro-) carbonium ion intermediates, which are products of the hydrolysis of the semustine drug. This reaction yields covalent cross-links between various nucleophilic DNA bases by alkylation, causing denaturation of the double helix and inhibiting separation of the DNA strand. By this mechanism, semustine interferes with rapidly proliferating cells and exerts its anti-tumour effects. Targets of the interstrand cross-link forming are specifically the N-7 of guanine, O-6 of adenine and other sites on the purine bases. This is depicted in Figure 3. The electrophilic property of semustine increases under acidic conditions, which makes the nucleophilic attack occur much faster. In general, acidic pH conditions cause a significant increase in the reaction rate of the semustine drug.

== Metabolism ==
After oral administration and absorption from the gastrointestinal tract, semustine undergoes rapid chemical decomposition and oxidative metabolism. Due to the lipophilic nature of semustine, the distribution is quickly across the tissue. Semustine is metabolised by the cytochrome P450 (CYP) mono-oxygenase system on the cyclohexyl ring carbons and the 2-chloroethyl sidechain resulting hydroxylated metabolites, which remains alkylating and anti-tumour active. Most of the biological effect is due to the generation of the chloroethyl carbonium ion from the ring hydroxylated metabolite. Ring hydroxylation occurs during the “first pass” through the gut wall and liver. The metabolites and decomposition products are excreted by the kidneys into the urine. Up to 60% of the dose is excreted by urine within 48 hours. The decomposition products present in the urine are cis-3-hydroxy-trans-4-methylcyclohexylamine, trans-4-methylcyclohexylamine, trans-4-hydroxymethylcyclohexylamine and trans-3-hydroxy-trans-4-methyl-cyclohexylamine. These are shown in Figure 4.

== Indications ==
Nitrosoureas such as semustine frequently cause nausea and vomiting, after admission (4 to 6 hours). The major toxic effects of semustine are thrombocytopenia and leukopenia caused by cumulative doses. Secondly the nephrotoxicity and hepatotoxicity of the semustine cause pulmonary fibrosis and renal dysfunction. Semustine nephrotoxicity is cumulative, the cumulative dose at which nephrotoxicity is likely to occur has been estimated to be near 2,000 mg/m2. This problem generally appears only in patients being treated for more than 1 year, which requires a prolonged survival time.

== Efficacy and side effects ==
=== Efficacy ===
Semustine was used to treat several different types of cancers. The main one was L1210 leukaemia and Hodgkin lymphoma. Other types are metastatic brain tumours, Lewis lung tumours, cancers of the digestive tract, lymphoma, melanoma, and epidermoid carcinoma of the lung. It has however not shown desired results as an antineoplastic drug and thus has never been approved for it. Combinations with other drugs have also been done in the 70’s but have not shown more beneficial results. In China, research is still done on the compound. These however also state the need for further investigation and possible different combinations of antineoplastic drugs to get a higher rate of complete response and overall survival after treatment.

=== Adverse effects ===
During the trials of semustine, sufficient evidence was found that semustine is a carcinogen. During a trail of 2067 patients, 14 cases of acute leukaemia were found. This was combined with a roughly 4% chance to acquire leukaemia disorder within six years. This trail was done on patients with gastrointestinal cancer and before the use of this antineoplastic drug, there were no recorded cases in the medical history of Connecticut that these combinations of cancer occur. This could be derived back to the start of the nitrosourea chemotherapy. Providing quantitative evidence that semustine is a carcinogen. For this reason it is also added to IARC group 1 for carcinogenic agents to humans.

== Effects on animals ==
The described carcinogenicity of semustine to humans has not been found in animals, specifically mice and rats. It is however still a carcinogen. There was an increase found in peritoneal sarcoma and lung tumours, indicating a different toxicity to animals.
