= Melphalan flufenamide =

Alkylating type cancer drug

Clinical data
- Trade names: Pepaxto, Pepaxti
- Other names: Melflufen, 4-[Bis-(2-chloroethyl)amino]-L-phenylalanine-4-fluoro-L-phenylalanine ethyl ester, J1
- AHFS/Drugs.com: Monograph
- License data: US DailyMed: Melphalan flufenamide
- Routes of administration: Intravenous
- ATC code: L01AA10 (WHO)

Legal status
- Legal status: US: Withdrawn from market; EU: Rx-only

Pharmacokinetic data
- Metabolism: hydrolysis

Identifiers
- IUPAC name: Ethyl (2S)-2-[[(2S)-2-amino-3-[4-[bis(2-chloroethyl)amino]phenyl]propanoyl]amino]-3-(4-fluorophenyl)propanoate
- CAS Number: 380449-51-4
- PubChem CID: 9935639
- DrugBank: DB16627
- ChemSpider: 8111267
- UNII: F70C5K4786
- ChEMBL: ChEMBL4303060
- CompTox Dashboard (EPA): DTXSID40191461

Chemical and physical data
- Formula: C_{24}H_{30}Cl_{2}FN_{3}O_{3}
- Molar mass: 498.42 g·mol^{−1}
- 3D model (JSmol): Interactive image
- SMILES: CCOC(=O)[C@H](CC1=CC=C(C=C1)F)NC(=O)[C@H](CC2=CC=C(C=C2)N(CCCl)CCCl)N
- InChI: InChI=1S/C24H30Cl2FN3O3/c1-2-33-24(32)22(16-18-3-7-19(27)8-4-18)29-23(31)21(28)15-17-5-9-20(10-6-17)30(13-11-25)14-12-26/h3-10,21-22H,2,11-16,28H2,1H3,(H,29,31)/t21-,22-/m0/s1; Key:YQZNKYXGZSVEHI-VXKWHMMOSA-N

Melphalan flufenamide is a medication used to treat refractory multiple myeloma. Known as melflufen, it is available in multiple Euopean countries,but not in the United States.

The most common adverse reactions include hematologic toxicity (low blood counts) which can be severe. In one study, 83% of patients had at least one form of hematologic toxicity. Additional adverse reactions include fatigue, gastrointestinal symptoms and infections.

Melphalan flufenamide was approved for medical use in the United States in February 2021, and in the European Union in August 2022. However, in October 2021 the drug was withdrawn from the US market.

== Medical uses ==
In the United States before market withdrawal, melphalan flufenamide was indicated in combination with dexamethasone for the treatment of adults with relapsed or refractory multiple myeloma, with relapsed or refractory multiple myeloma who have received at least four prior lines of therapy and whose disease is refractory to at least one proteasome inhibitor, one immunomodulatory agent, and one CD-38 directed monoclonal antibody.

In the European Union, melphalan flufenamide is indicated, in combination with dexamethasone, for the treatment of adults with multiple myeloma who have received at least three prior lines of therapies, whose disease is refractory to at least one proteasome inhibitor, one immunomodulatory agent, and one anti-CD38 monoclonal antibody, and who have demonstrated disease progression on or after the last therapy.

== Adverse effects ==
In a human Phase 1 trial, no dose-limiting toxicities (DLTs) were observed at lower doses. At doses above 50 mg, reversible neutropenias and thrombocytopenias were observed, and particularly evident in heavily pretreated patients. These side-effects are shared by most chemotherapies, including alkylating agents in general.

== Drug interactions ==
No drug interaction studies have been reported. Several in vitro studies indicate that melphalan flufenamide may be successfully combined with standard chemotherapy or targeted agents.

== Pharmacology ==
=== Pharmacokinetics ===
Pharmacokinetic analysis of plasma samples showed a rapid formation of melphalan; concentrations generally exceeded those of melphalan flufenamide during ongoing infusion. Melphalan flufenamide rapidly disappeared from plasma after infusion, while melphalan typically peaked a few minutes after the end of infusion. This suggests that melphalan flufenamide is rapidly and widely distributed to extravasal tissues, in which melphalan is formed and thereafter redistributed to plasma.

This rapid disappearance from plasma is likely due to hydrolytic enzymes. The Zn(2+) dependent ectopeptidase (also known as alanine aminopeptidase), degrades proteins and peptides with a N-terminal neutral amino acid. Aminopeptidase N is frequently overexpressed in tumors and has been associated with the growth of different human cancers suggesting it as a suitable target for anti-cancerous therapy.

=== Metabolism ===
Melphalan flufenamide is metabolized by aminopeptidase hydrolysis and by spontaneous hydrolysis on N-mustard.

=== Pharmacodynamics ===
Compared to melphalan, melphalan flufenamide exhibits significantly higher in vitro and in vivo activity in several models of human cancer. A preclinical study, performed at Dana–Farber Cancer Institute, demonstrated that melphalan flufenamide induced apoptosis in multiple myeloma cell lines, even those resistant to conventional treatment (including melphalan). In vivo effects in xenografted animals were also observed, and the results confirmed by M Chesi and co-workers – in a unique genetically engineered mouse model of multiple myeloma – are believed to be predictive of clinical efficacy.

== Chemistry ==
Chemically, the drug is best described as the ethyl ester of a dipeptide consisting of melphalan and the amino acid 4-fluoro-L-phenylalanine.

== History ==
Melphalan flufenamide is a peptidase enhanced cytotoxic (PEnC) with a targeted delivery within tumor cells of melphalan, a widely used classical chemotherapeutic belonging to a group of alkylating agents developed more than 50 years ago. Substantial clinical experience has been accumulated about melphalan since then. Numerous derivatives of melphalan, designed to increase the activity or selectivity, have been developed and investigated in vitro or in animal models. Melphalan flufenamide was synthesized, partly due to previous experience of an alkylating peptide cocktail named Peptichemio

In a Phase 1/2 trial, in solid tumor patients refractory to standard therapy, response evaluation showed disease stabilization in a majority of patients. In relapsed and refractory multiple-myeloma (RRMM) patients, promising activity was seen in heavily pre-treated RRMM patients where conventional therapies had failed; the median Progression-Free Survival was 9.4 months and the Duration of Response was 9.6 months.

Efficacy was evaluated in HORIZON (NCT02963493), a multicenter, single-arm trial. Eligible patients were required to have relapsed refractory multiple myeloma. Patients received melphalan flufenamide 40 mg intravenously on day 1 and dexamethasone 40 mg orally (20 mg for patients ≥75 years of age) on day 1, 8, 15 and 22 of each 28-day cycle until disease progression or unacceptable toxicity. Efficacy was evaluated in a subpopulation of 97 patients who received four or more prior lines of therapy and were refractory to at least one proteasome inhibitor, one immunomodulatory agent, and a CD38-directed antibody. The U.S. Food and Drug Administration (FDA) approved melphalan flufenamide based on evidence from a clinical trial of 157 adults with multiple myeloma. The trial was conducted at 17 sites in four countries in Spain, France, Italy and the US.

The FDA granted the application for melphalan flufenamide under the priority review and orphan drug programs.

In October 2021, Oncopeptides AB announced the withdrawal of Pepaxto from the US market after the OCEAN trial's data showed no improvement in terms of overall survival versus pomalidomide in the ITT group (19.8 months in the melphalan flufenamide group versus 25.0 months in the pomalidomide group, HR 1.10, 95% CI 0.85–1.44, p = 0,47).

== Society and culture ==
=== Legal status ===
In June 2022, the Committee for Medicinal Products for Human Use (CHMP) of the European Medicines Agency (EMA) adopted a positive opinion, recommending the granting of a marketing authorisation for the medicinal product Pepaxti, intended for the treatment of multiple myeloma. The applicant for this medicinal product is Oncopeptides AB. Melphalan flufenamide was approved for medical use in the European Union in August 2022.

=== Names ===
Melphalan flufenamide is the international nonproprietary name (INN).
