= Larotaxel =

Chemical compound

Clinical data
- ATC code: none

Identifiers
- IUPAC name: (2α,5β,7β,10β,13α)-4,10-Diacetoxy-1-hydroxy-13-{[(2R,3S)-2-hydroxy-3-({[(2-methyl-2-propanyl)oxy]carbonyl}amino)-3-phenylpropanoyl]oxy}-9-oxo-5,20-epoxy-7,19-cyclotax-11-en-2-yl benzoate
- CAS Number: 156294-36-9
- PubChem CID: 6918260
- ChemSpider: 5293466
- UNII: TWQ8K8A81Y
- CompTox Dashboard (EPA): DTXSID60935420

Chemical and physical data
- Formula: C_{45}H_{53}NO_{14}
- Molar mass: 831.912 g·mol^{−1}
- 3D model (JSmol): Interactive image
- SMILES: CC1=C2[C@H](C(=O)[C@]34C[C@H]3C[C@@H]5[C@]([C@H]4[C@@H]([C@@](C2(C)C)(C[C@@H]1OC(=O)[C@@H]([C@H](c6ccccc6)NC(=O)OC(C)(C)C)O)O)OC(=O)c7ccccc7)(CO5)OC(=O)C)OC(=O)C
- InChI: InChI=1S/C45H53NO14/c1-23-29(57-39(52)33(49)32(26-15-11-9-12-16-26)46-40(53)60-41(4,5)6)21-45(54)37(58-38(51)27-17-13-10-14-18-27)35-43(36(50)34(56-24(2)47)31(23)42(45,7)8)20-28(43)19-30-44(35,22-55-30)59-25(3)48/h9-18,28-30,32-35,37,49,54H,19-22H2,1-8H3,(H,46,53)/t28-,29+,30-,32+,33-,34-,35+,37+,43-,44+,45-/m1/s1; Key:DXOJIXGRFSHVKA-BZVZGCBYSA-N

Larotaxel (code names XRP9881, RPR109881) is a drug of the taxane type that has been used experimentally in chemotherapy.
