= Treosulfan =

Medication given to people before they have a bone marrow transplant

Clinical data
- Trade names: Trecondi, others
- Other names: 1,2,3,4-Butanetetrol, 1,4-dimethanesulfonate, Threitol 1,4-dimethanesulfonate, Threitol 1,4-bismethanesulfonate; L-Threitol 1,4-bis(methanesulfonate); Threosulphan; Treosulphan; Tresulfan
- AHFS/Drugs.com: Monograph
- MedlinePlus: a625065
- License data: US DailyMed: Treosulfan
- Pregnancy category: AU: D
- Routes of administration: By mouth, intravenous
- ATC code: L01AB02 (WHO)

Legal status
- Legal status: AU: S4 (Prescription only); CA: ℞-only; UK: POM (Prescription only); US: ℞-only; EU: Rx-only; In general: ℞ (Prescription only)

Identifiers
- IUPAC name: (2S,3S)-2,3-Dihydroxybutane-1,4-diyl dimethanesulfonate
- CAS Number: 299-75-2
- PubChem CID: 9882105
- DrugBank: DB11678
- ChemSpider: 8057780
- UNII: CO61ER3EPI
- KEGG: C19557; D07253
- ChEBI: CHEBI:82557
- CompTox Dashboard (EPA): DTXSID0026173
- ECHA InfoCard: 100.005.529

Chemical and physical data
- Formula: C_{6}H_{14}O_{8}S_{2}
- Molar mass: 278.29 g·mol^{−1}
- 3D model (JSmol): Interactive image
- Melting point: 101.5 to 105 °C (214.7 to 221.0 °F)
- SMILES: CS(=O)(=O)OC[C@@H]([C@H](COS(=O)(=O)C)O)O
- InChI: InChI=1S/C6H14O8S2/c1-15(9,10)13-3-5(7)6(8)4-14-16(2,11)12/h5-8H,3-4H2,1-2H3/t5-,6-/m0/s1; Key:YCPOZVAOBBQLRI-WDSKDSINSA-N

Treosulfan, sold under the brand name Trecondi among others, is an alkylating medication given to people before they have a bone marrow transplant from a donor known as allogeneic hematopoietic stem cell transplantation. It is used as a 'conditioning' treatment to clear the bone marrow and make room for the transplanted bone marrow cells, which can then produce healthy blood cells. It is used together with another medicine called fludarabine in adults and children from one month of age with blood cancers as well as in adults with other severe disorders requiring a bone marrow transplant. It belongs to the family of drugs called alkylating agents. In the body, treosulfan is converted into other compounds called epoxides which kill cells, especially cells that develop rapidly such as bone marrow cells, by attaching to their DNA while they are dividing. DNA cross-linking is considered a primary mechanism underlying the pharmacological action of treosulfan, and epoxides formed from treosulfan may cross-link DNA via at least two chemical pathways.

Preclinical studies in animal models have shown that treosulfan is widely distributed to the liver, lungs, bone marrow, and skeletal muscle, with tissue-to-plasma ratios of 0.96, 0.82, 0.82, and 0.77, respectively. Lower biodistribution was observed in the brain and the aqueous humor of the eye (both 0.10). In juvenile rats with an immature blood–brain barrier, brain exposure was higher (0.15) than in young adult rats. The monoepoxide of treosulfan (EBDM) exhibited greater brain penetration than the parent compound, with tissue-to-plasma ratios of 0.25 in young adult rats and 0.50 in juvenile rats.

The elimination half-life of treosulfan in patients is short, averaging 1.5–2.0 h. The apparent elimination half-life of the biologically active epoxides is similar to that of treosulfan, reflecting the phenomenon of formation rate-limited elimination.

The most common side effects include infections, nausea (feeling sick), stomatitis (inflammation of the lining of the mouth), vomiting, diarrhea, and abdominal pain (belly ache). Tiredness, febrile neutropenia (low white blood cell counts with fever) and high blood levels of bilirubin (a breakdown product of red blood cells) are also seen in more than 1 in 10 adults, and rash also affects more than 1 in 10 children. The most common adverse reactions include musculoskeletal pain, stomatitis, pyrexia, nausea, edema, infection, and vomiting. Selected grade 3 or 4 nonhematological laboratory abnormalities include increased GGT, increased bilirubin, increased ALT, increased AST, and increased creatinine.

Treosulfan was authorized for medical use in the European Union in June 2019, and approved for medical use in the United States in January 2025.

== Medical Uses ==
Treosulfan in combination with fludarabine is indicated as part of conditioning treatment prior to allogeneic haematopoietic stem cell transplantation in adults with malignant and non malignant diseases, and in children older than one month with malignant diseases.

== History ==
Two main studies showed that treosulfan is at least as effective as busulfan, another medicine used to prepare people for haematopoietic stem cell transplantation.

In one of the studies, involving 570 adults with acute myeloid leukaemia (a blood cancer) or myelodysplastic syndromes (conditions in which large numbers of abnormal blood cells are produced), 64% of patients given treosulfan (with fludarabine) had a successful transplant and were alive and disease-free after 2 years, compared with 51% of patients given busulfan (with fludarabine).

In an additional study in 70 children with blood cancers, 99% of children given treosulfan (with fludarabine) were alive three months after their transplant.

Efficacy was evaluated in MC-FludT.14/L Trial II (NCT00822393), a randomized active-controlled trial comparing treosulfan to busulfan with fludarabine as a preparative regimen for allogeneic transplantation. Eligible patients included adults 18 to 70 years old with AML or MDS, Karnofsky performance status ≥ 60%, and age ≥ 50 years or hematopoietic cell transplantation comorbidity index [HCTCI] score > 2. There were 570 patients randomized to treosulfan (n=280) or busulfan (n=290).

== Society and culture ==
=== Legal status ===
Treosulfan was authorized for medical use in the European Union in June 2019, and approved for medical use in the United States in January 2025.

The US Food and Drug Administration granted orphan drug designation to treosulfan in 1994, for the treatment of ovarian cancer; and in 2015, for conditioning treatment prior to hematopoietic stem cell transplantation in malignant and non-malignant diseases in adults and pediatric patients.

In February 2004, orphan designation (EU/3/04/186) was granted by the European Commission to medac Gesellschaft fuer klinische Spezialpräparate mbH, Germany, for treosulfan for the conditioning treatment prior to haematopoietic progenitor cell transplantation.

=== Names ===
Treosulfan is the international nonproprietary name.

Treosulfan is sold under the brand names Trecondi, Grafapex and Ovastat.
