= Pipobroman =

Chemical compound

Clinical data
- Trade names: Vercite, Vercyte
- AHFS/Drugs.com: International Drug Names
- ATC code: L01AX02 (WHO)

Identifiers
- IUPAC name: 3-bromo-1-[4-(3-bromopropanoyl) piperazin-1-yl]-propan-1-one
- CAS Number: 54-91-1
- PubChem CID: 4842
- IUPHAR/BPS: 7271
- DrugBank: DB00236
- ChemSpider: 4676
- UNII: 6Q99RDT97R
- KEGG: D00467
- ChEBI: CHEBI:8242
- ChEMBL: ChEMBL1585
- CompTox Dashboard (EPA): DTXSID7023485

Chemical and physical data
- Formula: C_{10}H_{16}Br_{2}N_{2}O_{2}
- Molar mass: 356.058 g·mol^{−1}
- 3D model (JSmol): Interactive image
- SMILES: O=C(N1CCN(C(=O)CCBr)CC1)CCBr
- InChI: InChI=1S/C10H16Br2N2O2/c11-3-1-9(15)13-5-7-14(8-6-13)10(16)2-4-12/h1-8H2; Key:NJBFOOCLYDNZJN-UHFFFAOYSA-N

Pipobroman (trade names Vercite, Vercyte) is an anti-cancer drug that probably acts as an alkylating agent, and is marketed in France and Italy.
