= Clofarabine =

Chemical compound

Clinical data
- Trade names: Clolar, Evoltra
- AHFS/Drugs.com: Monograph
- MedlinePlus: a607012
- License data: EU EMA: by INN; US DailyMed: Clofarabine
- Routes of administration: Intravenous
- ATC code: L01BB06 (WHO)

Legal status
- Legal status: AU: S4 (Prescription only); US: ℞-only; EU: Rx-only; In general: ℞ (Prescription only)

Identifiers
- IUPAC name: 5-(6-amino-2-chloro-purin-9-yl) -4-fluoro-2- (hydroxymethyl)oxolan-3-ol
- CAS Number: 123318-82-1
- PubChem CID: 119182
- IUPHAR/BPS: 6802
- DrugBank: DB00631
- ChemSpider: 106472
- UNII: 762RDY0Y2H
- KEGG: D03546
- ChEBI: CHEBI:681569
- ChEMBL: ChEMBL1750
- CompTox Dashboard (EPA): DTXSID5046437
- ECHA InfoCard: 100.159.663

Chemical and physical data
- Formula: C_{10}H_{11}ClFN_{5}O_{3}
- Molar mass: 303.68 g·mol^{−1}
- 3D model (JSmol): Interactive image
- SMILES: Clc1nc(c2ncn(c2n1)[C@@H]3O[C@@H]([C@@H](O)[C@@H]3F)CO)N
- InChI: InChI=1S/C10H11ClFN5O3/c11-10-15-7(13)5-8(16-10)17(2-14-5)9-4(12)6(19)3(1-18)20-9/h2-4,6,9,18-19H,1H2,(H2,13,15,16)/t3-,4+,6-,9-/m1/s1; Key:WDDPHFBMKLOVOX-AYQXTPAHSA-N

Clofarabine is a purine nucleoside antimetabolite marketed in the United States and Canada as Clolar. In Europe and Australia/New Zealand the product is marketed under the name Evoltra. It is FDA-approved for treating relapsed or refractory acute lymphoblastic leukaemia (ALL) in children after at least two other types of treatment have failed. Some investigations of effectiveness in cases of acute myeloid leukaemia (AML) and juvenile myelomonocytic leukaemia (JMML) have been carried out. Ongoing trials are assessing its efficacy for managing other cancers.

== Approval ==
Clolar was Food and Drug Administration (FDA) approved 28 December 2004. (Under accelerated approval regulations requiring further clinical studies.)

== Side effects ==
- Tumor lysis syndrome (TLS). Clofarabine quickly kills leukaemia cells in the blood. The body may react to this. Signs include hyperkalemia, hyperuricemia, and hyperphosphatemia. TLS is very serious and can lead to death if it is not treated right away.
- Systemic inflammatory response syndrome (SIRS): symptoms include fast breathing, fast heartbeat, low blood pressure, and fluid in the lungs.
- Bone marrow problems (suppression). Clofarabine can stop the bone marrow from making enough red blood cells, white blood cells, and platelets. Serious side effects that can happen because of bone marrow suppression include severe infection (sepsis), bleeding, and anemia.
- Effects on pregnancy and breastfeeding. Girls and women should not become pregnant or breastfeed during treatment which may harm the baby.
- Dehydration and low blood pressure. Clofarabine can cause vomiting and diarrhea which may lead to low body fluid (dehydration). Signs and symptoms of dehydration include dizziness, lightheadedness, fainting spells, or decreased urination.
- Other side effects. The most common side effects are stomach problems (including vomiting, diarrhea, and nausea), and effects on blood cells (including low red blood cells count, low white blood cell count, low platelet count, fever, and infection). Clofarabine can also cause tachycardia and can affect the liver and kidneys.

== Contraindications ==
- pregnancy or planned pregnancy
- breast-feeding
- liver problems
- kidney problems

== Drug interactions ==
- nephrotoxic drugs
- hepatotoxic drugs

== Delivery ==
- By intravenous infusion.
- Dosage is a 2-hour infusion (52 mg/m^{2}) every day for five days. The cycle is repeated every 2 to 6 weeks.
- Regular blood tests to monitor his or her blood cells, kidney function, and liver function.

== Biology ==
Clofarabine is a second-generation purine nucleoside analog designed to overcome biological limitations observed with ara-A and fludarabine. A 2´(S)-fluorine in clofarabine significantly increased the stability of the glycosidic bond in acidic solution and toward phosphorolytic cleavage as compared to fludarabine. A chlorine substitution at the 2-position of the adenine base avoids production of a 2-fluoroadenine analog, a precursor to the toxic 2-fluoro-adenosine-5´-triphosphate and prevents deamination of the base as compared to ara-A.

Clofarabine can be administered intravenously or given orally. Clofarabine enters cells via hENT1, hENT2, and hCNT2, whereupon it is phosphorylated by deoxycytidine kinase to generate clofarabine-5´-monophosphate. The rate-limiting step in clofarabine metabolism is clofarabine-5´-diphosphosphate. Clofarabine-5´-triphosphate is the active-metabolite, and it inhibits ribonucleotide reductase, resulting in a decrease cellular dNTP concentrations, which promotes greater incorporation of clofarabine-5´-triphosphate during DNA synthesis. Embedded clofarabine-5´-monophosphate in the DNA promotes polymerase arrest at the replication fork, triggering DNA repair mechanisms that without repair lead to DNA strand breaks in vitro and cytochrome c-mediated apoptosis in vitro. Studies using cell lines have shown that clofarabine-5´-triphosphate can also be incorporated into RNA.

Mechanisms of resistance and turnover have been reported. Clofarabine-resistance arises from decreased deoxycytidine kinase activity in vitro. ABC transporter ABCG2 promotes export of clofarabine-5´-monophosphate and thus limits the cytotoxic effects of this analog in vivo. Biochemically, clofarabine-5’-triphosphate was shown to be substrate for SAMHD1, thus potentially limiting the amount of active compound in cells.
