= Triaziquone =

Chemical compound

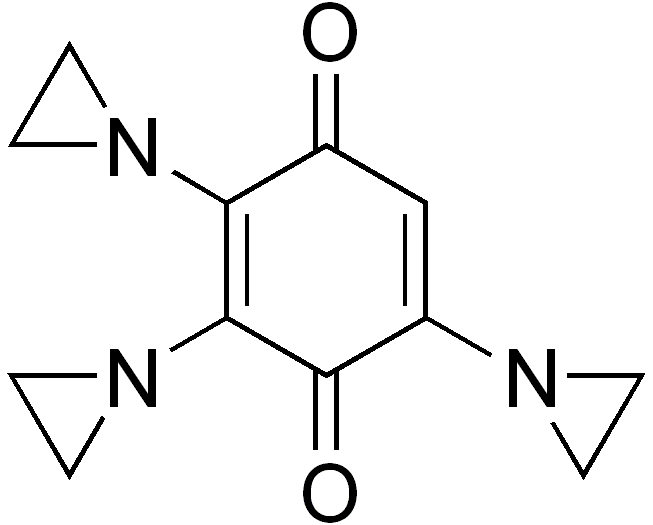

Clinical data
- Other names: 2,3,5-Tris(aziridin-1-yl)cyclohexa-2,5-diene-1,4-dione; Tris(aziridinyl)-p-benzoquinone
- ATC code: L01AC02 (WHO)

Identifiers
- IUPAC name: 2,3,5-tris(aziridin-1-yl)benzo-1,4-quinone
- CAS Number: 68-76-8
- PubChem CID: 6235
- ChemSpider: 5999
- UNII: F3D5D9P25I
- KEGG: C19542
- ChEBI: CHEBI:27090
- CompTox Dashboard (EPA): DTXSID1021370
- ECHA InfoCard: 100.000.629

Chemical and physical data
- Formula: C_{12}H_{13}N_{3}O_{2}
- Molar mass: 231.255 g·mol^{−1}
- 3D model (JSmol): Interactive image
- SMILES: C1CN1C2=CC(=O)C(=C(C2=O)N3CC3)N4CC4
- InChI: InChI=1S/C12H13N3O2/c16-9-7-8(13-1-2-13)12(17)11(15-5-6-15)10(9)14-3-4-14/h7H,1-6H2; Key:PXSOHRWMIRDKMP-UHFFFAOYSA-N

Triaziquone is a drug used in chemotherapy.

It is aziridinylbenzoquinone-based, and may have potential antineoplastic activity.

It is an alkylating agent. It can react with DNA to form intrastrand crosslinks. It is a member of aziridines as well.
