= Fotemustine =

Chemical compound

Clinical data
- Trade names: Mustophoran
- AHFS/Drugs.com: International Drug Names
- Pregnancy category: AU: D
- ATC code: L01AD05 (WHO)

Legal status
- Legal status: AU: S4 (Prescription only)

Identifiers
- IUPAC name: (RS)-diethyl (1-{[(2-chloroethyl)(nitroso)carbamoyl]amino} ethyl)phosphonate
- CAS Number: 92118-27-9
- PubChem CID: 104799
- DrugBank: DB04106
- ChemSpider: 94600
- UNII: GQ7JL9P5I2
- KEGG: D07255
- ChEMBL: ChEMBL549386
- CompTox Dashboard (EPA): DTXSID80869091
- ECHA InfoCard: 100.158.792

Chemical and physical data
- Formula: C_{9}H_{19}ClN_{3}O_{5}P
- Molar mass: 315.69 g·mol^{−1}
- 3D model (JSmol): Interactive image
- SMILES: O=P(OCC)(OCC)C(NC(=O)N(N=O)CCCl)C
- InChI: InChI=1S/C9H19ClN3O5P/c1-4-17-19(16,18-5-2)8(3)11-9(14)13(12-15)7-6-10/h8H,4-7H2,1-3H3,(H,11,14); Key:YAKWPXVTIGTRJH-UHFFFAOYSA-N

Fotemustine is a nitrosourea alkylating agent used in the treatment of metastatic melanoma. It is available in Europe but has not been approved by the United States FDA. A study has shown that fotemustine produces improved response rates but does not increase survival (over dacarbazine in the treatment of disseminated cutaneous melanoma. Median survival was 7.3 months with fotemustine versus 5.6 months with DTIC (P=.067). There was also toxicity prevalence in fotemustine arm. The main toxicity was grade 3 to 4 neutropenia (51% with fotemustine v 5% with DTIC) and thrombocytopenia (43% v 6%, respectively).
