= Valrubicin =

Pharmaceutical drug

Clinical data
- AHFS/Drugs.com: Consumer Drug Information
- MedlinePlus: a611021
- Routes of administration: Intravesical
- ATC code: L01DB09 (WHO)

Legal status
- Legal status: In general: ℞ (Prescription only)

Pharmacokinetic data
- Bioavailability: Negligible
- Protein binding: >99%
- Metabolism: Negligible
- Excretion: In urine

Identifiers
- IUPAC name: 2-oxo-2-[(2S,4S)-2,5,12-trihydroxy-7-methoxy-6,11-dioxo-4-({2,3,6-trideoxy-3-[(trifluoroacetyl)amino]hexopyranosyl}oxy)-1,2,3,4,6,11-hexahydrotetracen-2-yl]ethyl pentanoate
- CAS Number: 56124-62-0
- PubChem CID: 454216
- DrugBank: DB00385
- ChemSpider: 399974
- UNII: 2C6NUM6878
- ChEMBL: ChEMBL1096885
- CompTox Dashboard (EPA): DTXSID9046497
- ECHA InfoCard: 100.205.793

Chemical and physical data
- Formula: C_{34}H_{36}F_{3}NO_{13}
- Molar mass: 723.651 g·mol^{−1}
- 3D model (JSmol): Interactive image
- SMILES: FC(F)(F)C(=O)N[C@@H]5[C@H](O)[C@@H](O[C@@H](O[C@@H]4c3c(O)c2C(=O)c1c(OC)cccc1C(=O)c2c(O)c3C[C@@](O)(C(=O)COC(=O)CCCC)C4)C5)C
- InChI: InChI=1S/C34H36F3NO13/c1-4-5-9-21(40)49-13-20(39)33(47)11-16-24(19(12-33)51-22-10-17(27(41)14(2)50-22)38-32(46)34(35,36)37)31(45)26-25(29(16)43)28(42)15-7-6-8-18(48-3)23(15)30(26)44/h6-8,14,17,19,22,27,41,43,45,47H,4-5,9-13H2,1-3H3,(H,38,46)/t14-,17-,19-,22-,27+,33-/m0/s1; Key:ZOCKGBMQLCSHFP-KQRAQHLDSA-N

Valrubicin (N-trifluoroacetyladriamycin-14-valerate, trade name Valstar) is a chemotherapy drug used to treat bladder cancer. Valrubicin is a semisynthetic analog of the anthracycline doxorubicin, and is administered by infusion directly into the bladder.

It was originally launched as Valstar in the U.S. in 1999 for intravesical therapy of Bacille Calmette-Guérin (BCG)-refractory carcinoma in situ of the urinary bladder in patients in whom cystectomy would be associated with unacceptable morbidity or mortality; however, it was voluntarily withdrawn in 2002 due to manufacturing issues. Valstar was relaunched on September 3, 2009.

== Side effects ==
- Blood in urine
- Incontinence
- painful or difficult urination
- Unusually frequent urination
