= Doxifluridine =

Nucleoside analog prodrug

Clinical data
- Other names: Doxyfluridine; doxifluridine; 5'-deoxy-5-fluorouridine; 5'-deoxy-5'-fluorouridine; 5'-fluoro-5'-deoxyuridine; 5'-dFUrd; 5'-DFUR; Furtulon; Ro 21-9738

Identifiers
- IUPAC name: 1-[(2R,3R,4S,5R)-3,4-Dihydroxy-5-methyloxolan-2-yl]-5-fluoropyrimidine-2,4-dione
- CAS Number: 3094-09-5
- PubChem CID: 18343
- DrugBank: DB12947
- ChemSpider: 17322
- UNII: V1JK16Y2JP
- CompTox Dashboard (EPA): DTXSID2022967
- ECHA InfoCard: 100.019.491

Chemical and physical data
- Formula: C_{9}H_{11}FN_{2}O_{5}
- Molar mass: 246.194 g·mol^{−1}
- 3D model (JSmol): Interactive image
- SMILES: C[C@@H]1[C@H]([C@H]([C@@H](O1)N2C=C(C(=O)NC2=O)F)O)O
- InChI: InChI=1S/C9H11FN2O5/c1-3-5(13)6(14)8(17-3)12-2-4(10)7(15)11-9(12)16/h2-3,5-6,8,13-14H,1H3,(H,11,15,16)/t3-,5-,6-,8-/m1/s1; Key:ZWAOHEXOSAUJHY-ZIYNGMLESA-N

Doxifluridine (5'-deoxy-5-fluorouridine) is a second generation nucleoside analog prodrug developed by Roche and used as a cytostatic agent in chemotherapy in several Asian countries including China and South Korea. Doxifluridine is not FDA-approved for use in the USA. It is currently being evaluated in several clinical trials as a stand-alone or combination therapy treatment.

== Biology ==
5-Fluorouracil (5-FU), the nucleobase of doxifluridine, is currently an FDA-approved antimetabolite. 5-FU is normally administered intravenously to prevent its degradation by dihydropyrimidine dehydrogenase in the gut wall. Doxifluridine is a fluoropyrimidine derivative of 5-FU, thus a second-generation nucleoside prodrug. Doxifluridine was designed to improve oral bioavailability in order to avoid dihydropyrimidine dehydrogenase degradation in the digestive system.

Within a cell, pyrimidine nucleoside phosphorylase or thymidine phosphorylase can metabolize doxifluridine into 5-FU. It is also a metabolite of capecitabine. High levels of pyrimidine-nucleoside phosphorylase and thymidine phosphorylase are expressed in esophageal, breast, cervical, pancreatic, and hepatic cancers. Liberation of 5-FU is the active metabolite and leads to inhibition of DNA synthesis and cell death.

== Side effects ==
High thymidine phosphorylase expression is also found in the human intestinal tract, resulting in dose-limiting toxicity (diarrhea) in some individuals.

The most frequent adverse effects for doxifluridine were neurotoxicity and mucositis.

== Brand names ==
Doxifluridine is sold under many brand names:

Brand name	Company	Country
Didox	Shin Poong Pharm. Co., Ltd.	South Korea
Doxyfluridine	Kwang Dong	South Korea
Doxifluridine cap	Myungmoon Pharma Co. Ltd.	South Korea
Ai Feng	Hengrui	China and Japan
Doxifluridine	XinShiDai Pharmaceutical	China and Japan
Furtulon	Roche, Chugai	China and Japan
Ke Fu	Zhaohui	China and Japan
Ke Tuo	Southwest	China and Japan
Qi Nuo Bi Tong	Wanjie High-Tech	China and Japan
Shu Qi	Team	China and Japan
Tan Nuo	Xinchang Medicine & Chemical Co Ltd	China and Japan
Yi Di An	Pacific	China and Japan
