= Thiotepa =

Chemical compound

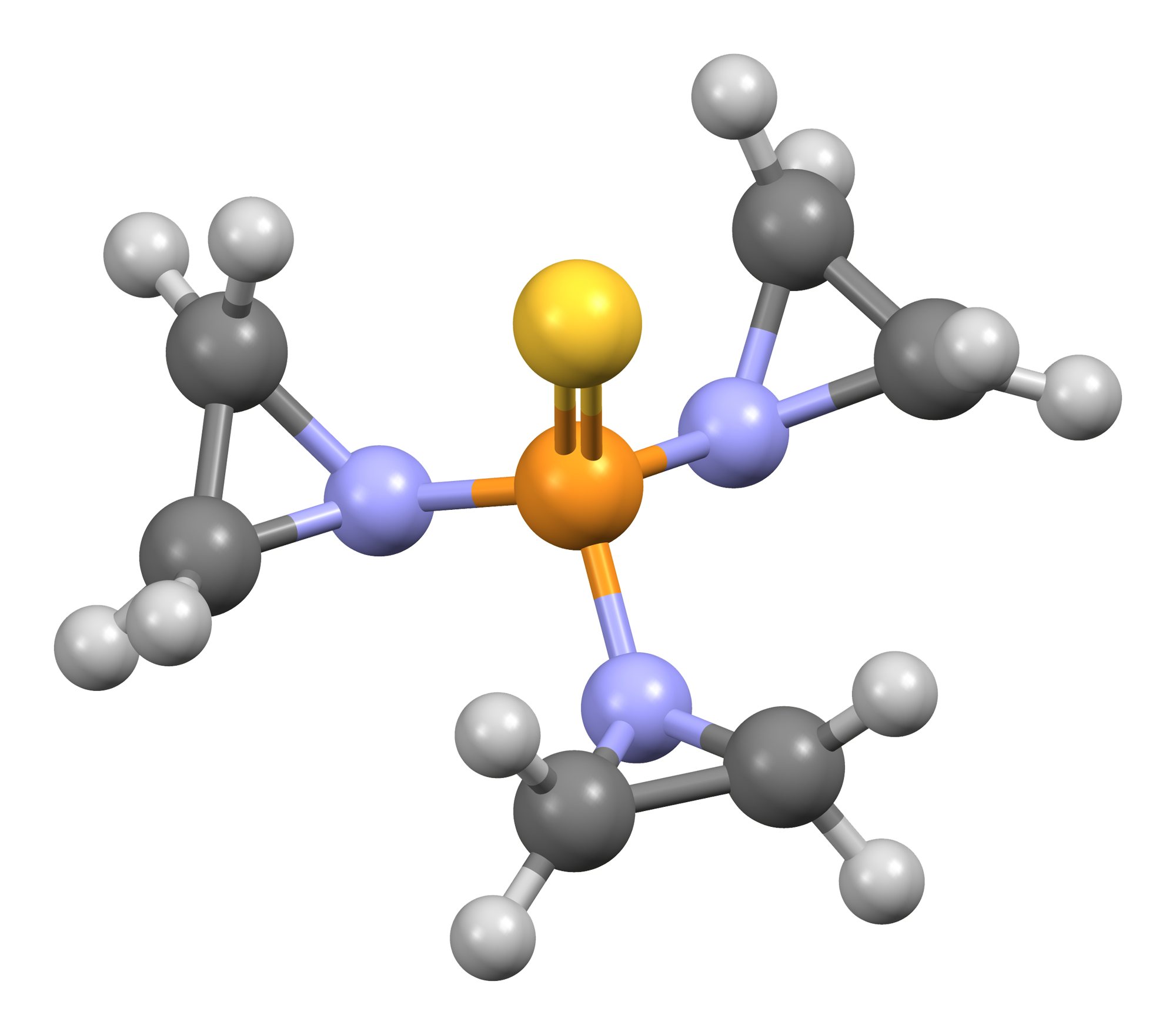

Clinical data
- Trade names: Tepadina
- Other names: N,N',N''(-triethylenethiophosphoramide, INN, Thiotepa, Tepadina, Tepylute
- AHFS/Drugs.com: Monograph
- MedlinePlus: a682821
- License data: US DailyMed: Thiotepa
- Pregnancy category: AU: D
- Routes of administration: Intravenous, intracavitary, intravesical
- ATC code: L01AC01 (WHO)

Legal status
- Legal status: AU: S4 (Prescription only); CA: ℞-only; UK: POM (Prescription only); US: ℞-only; EU: Rx-only

Pharmacokinetic data
- Metabolism: Liver (CYP2B6, CYP3A)
- Metabolites: Phase 1: Tetraethylenepentamine (tepa); Phase 2: Thiotepa-mercapturate
- Elimination half-life: 1.5–4.1 hours
- Excretion: Kidney; 6 hours for thiotepa 8 hours for TEPA

Identifiers
- IUPAC name: 1,1′,1″-Phosphorothioyltriaziridine
- CAS Number: 52-24-4
- PubChem CID: 5453
- IUPHAR/BPS: 7622
- DrugBank: DB04572
- ChemSpider: 5254
- UNII: 905Z5W3GKH
- KEGG: D00583
- ChEMBL: ChEMBL671
- CompTox Dashboard (EPA): DTXSID0021339
- ECHA InfoCard: 100.000.124

Chemical and physical data
- Formula: C_{6}H_{12}N_{3}PS
- Molar mass: 189.22 g·mol^{−1}
- 3D model (JSmol): Interactive image
- Melting point: 51.5 °C (124.7 °F)
- Solubility in water: 0.19 g/mL (water, 25 °C); Freely soluble in alcohol, diethyl ether and chloroform mg/mL (20 °C)
- SMILES: S=P(N1CC1)(N2CC2)N3CC3
- InChI: InChI=1S/C6H12N3PS/c11-10(7-1-2-7,8-3-4-8)9-5-6-9/h1-6H2; Key:FOCVUCIESVLUNU-UHFFFAOYSA-N

Thiotepa (N,N',N''(-triethylenethiophosphoramide, INN), sold under the brand name Tepadina among others, is an anti-cancer medication.

Thiotepa is an organophosphorus compound with the formula (C_{2}H_{4}N)_{3}PS.

== History ==
Thiotepa and its synthesis were patented in 1952 by the American Cyanamid company. It was made for use in the textile industry and in the production process of plastics. However, thiotepa entered human trials in 1953 and was found to be effective against acute myeloid leukemia, chronic myelogenous leukemia, and Hodgkin's lymphoma. The first clinical trial noted a "reasonable margin for safety" between the apparent dose and undesired bone marrow suppression

In January 2007, the European Medicines Agency (EMA) designated thiotepa as an orphan drug. In April 2007, the United States FDA designated thiotepa as a conditioning treatment for use prior to hematopoietic stem cell transplantation.

In June 2024, the FDA approved a ready-to-dilute liquid formulation of thiotepa to treat breast and ovarian cancer.

== Structure ==
Thiotepa consists of three aziridine rings (also known as ethylenimines), which are cyclic compounds containing two carbon atoms and one nitrogen atom, all bonded to a phosphine sulfide group. The phosphine sulfide acts as an activating group, activating the aziridine groups.

== Reactivity ==
Thiotepa is a reactive compound that, under acidic, neutral, or alkaline conditions, undergoes solvolysis, leading to potential side reactions such as polymerization and dimerization into piperazines. During acidic degradation, thiotepa reacts with chloride ions to produce monochloro, dichloro, and trichloro derivatives. Acidic conditions also result in the formation of tepa (N,N′,N″-triethylenephosphoramide), the first identified and more reactive metabolite of thiotepa.

In alkaline media, thiotepa undergoes degradation, though no detectable byproducts were identified. Like other aziridine-containing compounds, hydroxyl substitution reactions may release aziridine. This degradation pathway has also been reported for tepa. The stability of thiotepa in biological samples is dependent on pH. In plasma, the monochloro derivative of thiotepa is formed, while in urine, both monochloro and dichloro derivatives have been found. Thiotepa is most stable between pH 7 and 11. In plasma under physiological conditions, the compound has a half-life of five days, whereas in urine at 37 °C, the half-life is 16 minutes at pH 4 and 21 hours at pH 6.

== Synthesis ==
Two separate syntheses of thiotepa have been described in literature. The most prevalent method involves the addition of an excess of aziridine to thiophosphoryl chloride in the presence of a base such as triethylamine (TEA) (or another molar equivalent of aziridine) and a suitable solvent (e.g., ether or benzene). The first molecule of aziridine reacts with thiophosphoryl chloride to produce dichloridophosphorothionate, which is sufficiently reactive due to the poor overlap of the nitrogen lone pair with the P=S bond, allowing it to react with another two molecules of aziridine

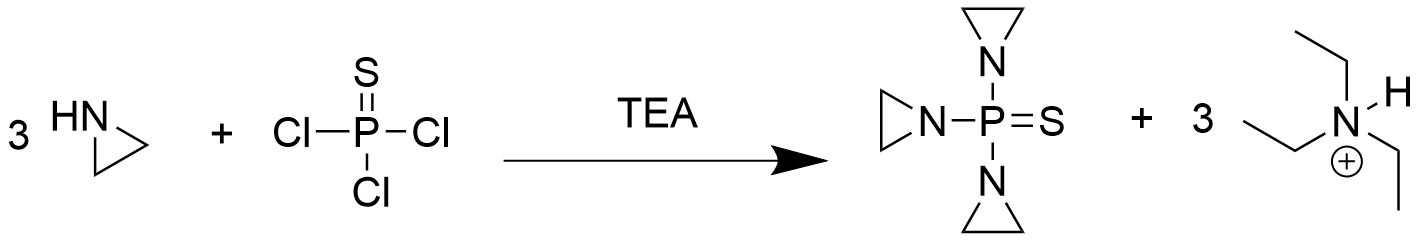
Thiotepa synthesis via thiophosphoryl chloride and aziridine

Thiotepa has also been synthesized from phosphorus trichloride and six molar equivalents of aziridine. The trivalent triamide formed reacts with octasulfur (S_{8}) in benzene.

== Medical uses ==
Thiotepa is used in combination with other chemotherapy agents to treat cancer. It can be given with or without total body irradiation (TBI) to prepare the body for allogeneic or autologous hematopoietic progenitor cell transplantation (HPCT), which replaces damaged blood-forming cells with donor cells. This treatment is used in both adults and children for blood cancers such as Hodgkin lymphoma and leukemia. Thiotepa is also used with high-dose chemotherapy and HPCT support to treat certain solid tumors in adults and children.

Thiotepa is used in palliative care for several types of cancer, including breast cancer, ovarian cancer, papillary thyroid cancer, and bladder cancer. It is also used to control intracavitary effusions caused by serosal neoplastic deposits, which refers to fluid buildup resulting from cancer spreading to the lining of body cavities.

In Japan, a widely used regimen consisting of high-dose thiotepa and melphalan, followed by autologous peripheral blood stem cell rescue, is used to treat high-risk neuroblastoma.

=== Administration ===
Thiotepa is mainly administered intravenously and intravesically. The administered dose regarding different types of cancer variates between 3 mg/kg/day to 13 mg/kg/day. Thiotepa is unreliably absorbed from the gastrointestinal tract: acid instability prevents thiotepa from being administered orally. Thiotepa is also used in the treatment of bladder cancer during this treatment thiotepa is used as intravesical chemotherapy. Thiotepa is frequently administered in combination with other chemotherapeutic agents such as busulfan and carboplatin.

=== Clinical outcomes ===
In clinical trials the outcome of different types of treatment is compared to identify if a compound or regimen is favourable for the patient. The choice of treatment in the conditioning therapy can have a profound impact on progression-free survival (PNS), overall survival (OS), relapse incidence (RI) and non-relapse mortality (NRM). The studies mentioned summarize key findings comparing various conditioning regimens.

Studies on conditioning regimens for hematopoietic cell transplant in primary central nervous system lymphoma (PCNSL) have shown that thiotepa based therapies thiotepa/busulfan/cyclophosphamide (TBC) and thiotepa/carmustine (TT-BCNU) improve progression-free survival of PCNSL compared to traditional therapies carmustine/etoposide/cytarabine/melphalan (BEAM). Research also suggests that in BEAM if carmustine is exchanged for thiotepa no statistical difference was found in PFS, OS and RI. Furthermore, the capacity of thiotepa to pass the blood-brain barrier may allow optimizing the therapy for patients with Central Nervous System involvement of increased CNS relapse risk. Another study compared total body irradiation (TBI) and thiotepa, busulfan and cyclophosphamide/fludarabine (TTB) as a conditioning regimen of patients with acute lymphoblastic leukemia undergoing allogenic hematopoietic stem cell transplantation. No statistical difference was found in the overall survival but the RI was higher in the TBI regimen but the NRM was lower with TTB suggesting that TBB might be a viable alternative to TBI.

== Metabolism ==
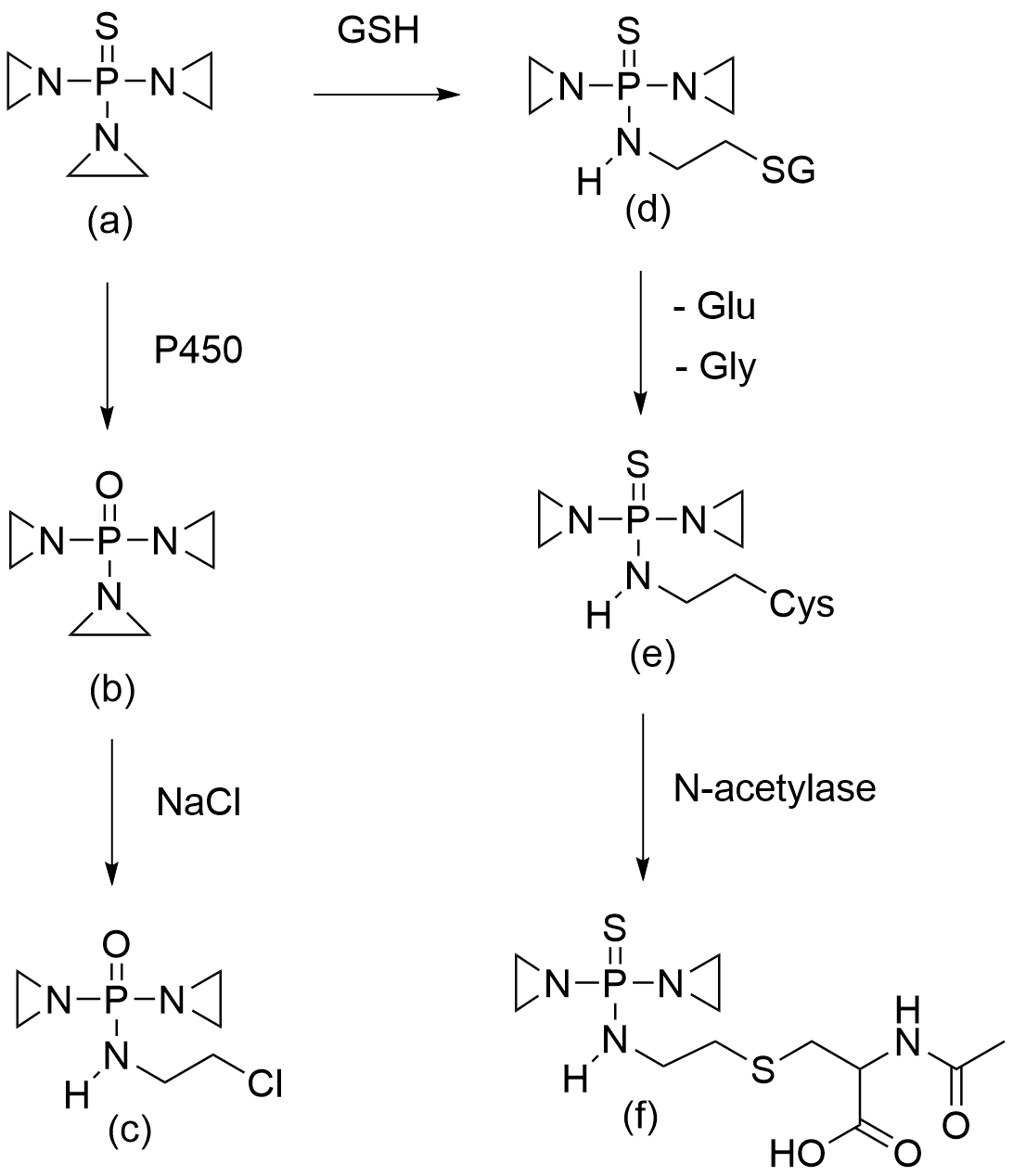
Biotransformation of thiotepa, (a) thiotepa, (b) tepa, (c) monochlorotepa, (d) GSH conjugate of thioTEPA, (e) thiotepacysteinate, (f) thiotepa-mercapturate.

The metabolism of thiotepa primarily takes place in the liver, following both phase 1 and phase 2 metabolic pathways. Phase 1 involves reactions which change chemical moieties such as oxidation, reduction, and hydrolysis, while phase 2 includes the addition of endogenous groups to foreign compounds.

Phase 1 metabolism of thiotepa is predominantly mediated by the cytochrome P450 enzyme system, major CYP2B6 and minor CYP3A4. In this phase an oxidation and desulfuration reactions convert thiotepa into its more active metabolite tepa. Tepa itself exhibits a longer plasma half-life (3 to 24 hours) than thiotepa (1 to 3 hours) and contributes to the overall pharmacological activity of the drug.

In phase 2 thiotepa is detoxified via the conjugation with glutathione by glutathione S-transferase. This is followed by the removal of the glutamyl and glycine moieties, and concludes with the N-acetylation of the cysteine conjugate by N-acetylase to form thiotepa-mercapturate. This derivative is more water-soluble, facilitating urinary excretion. Tepa is not conjugated to glutathione but reacts further in the urine and plasma to monochloro tepa. The conversion to a β-chloroethyl moiety depends on the pH and the chloride concentration. The formation of monochloride tepa mainly occurs in the urine.

Enzymes responsible for metabolising compounds can show varying efficiency in different individuals or populations, this is called polymorphism. In a study regarding thiotepa metabolism by Ekhart et al., it was found that glutathione S-transferase shows polymorphism. This variation resulted in some patients in slower glutathione conjugation and consequently, to a 45% increase in combined exposure to thiotepa and tepa.

The volume of distribution has been reported to range from 40,8 L/m^{2} to 75,0 L/m^{2}. This high value is due to the highly lipophilic character of thiotepa and can therefore easily cross cell membranes and distribute into fatty tissues. In addition, thiotepa can easily cross the blood brain barrier and can rapidly penetrate the central nervous system. In plasma, 70 to 90% of the compound remains unbound to proteins, while the remaining 10–30% is primarily bound to gamma globulin, with minimal binding to albumin. Gamma globulin primarily functions as antibodies for the immune system, while albumin serves as a transport protein.

All metabolites are excreted in the urine, which is nearly complete in 6 to 8 hours, with tepa and thiotepa-mercapturate each accounting for approximately 11.1% of the excretion. In contrast, the excretion of monochloride tepa and thiotepa is significantly lower, at only 0.5% each. The total clearance of thiotepa ranged from 11,4 to 23,2 L/h/m^{2}. The total excretion of thiotepa and its identified metabolites accounts for 54 to 100% of the total alkylating activity, suggesting the existence of other alkylating metabolites. During the conversion of glutathione conjugates into N-acetylcysteine conjugates, intermediates such as glutathione, cysteinyl glycine, and cysteine conjugates are formed. These metabolites are not detected in urine and, if formed, are likely excreted in bile or rapidly converted into thiotepa-mercapturate. Additionally, due to its high lipophilicity, thiotepa is excreted in minor amounts by the skin via sweat.

== Molecular mechanism of action ==
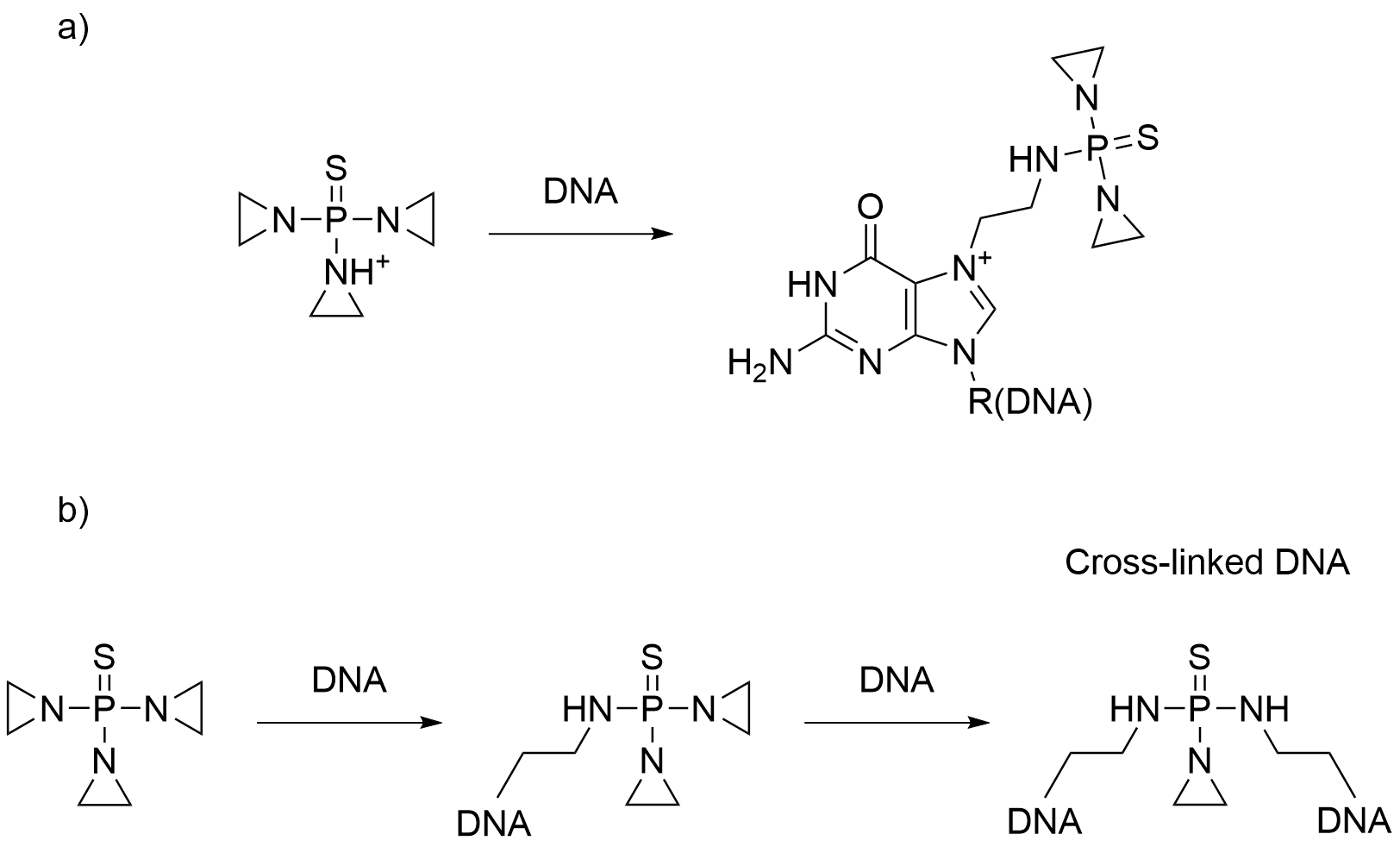
Mechanism of alkylation by thiotepa. a): Alkylation of DNA via the N-7 position of guanine. b): General mechanism forming monoalkylated and cross-linked DNA.

Thiotepa, as well as its more reactive metabolite, tepa, work as an alkylating agent via its aziridine ring. Due to the basic nature of aziridine and the physiological pH, aziridine is protonated to form the aziridinium ion, resulting in an electrophilic moiety that is highly susceptible to nucleophiles. DNA reacts through the nucleophilic N-7 position of guanine onto the electrophilic aziridine ring, rendering alkylated nucleobases. Thiotepa contains three reactive aziridine rings, allowing a single molecule to alkylate multiple nucleobases. Hence, it is a polyfunctional alkylating agent. This property also gives rise to its ability to cross-link DNA strands. Apart from its mechanism of action, it is suggested that thiotepa can function as a prodrug. Due to its moderate lipophilicity, it first penetrates the cell membrane, followed by hydrolysis to release the more hydrophilic aziridine ring. The aziridine ring can once again alkylate the DNA. The highly reactive metabolite tepa can be considered as an active metabolite and alkylates DNA similar to its parent drug. Ultimately, the alkylation of DNA leads to cell damage and can lead to cell death. Cross-linking blocks the separation of DNA strands, inhibiting replication and the proliferation of cells.

== Toxicity ==
Thiotepa is associated with a range of side effects. The severity and type of side effects may vary based on the dosage, duration of treatment, and individual patient factors.

=== Myelosuppression ===
Proliferating cells, such as tumour cells, are more sensitive to alkylating agents, rendering these drugs useful for chemotherapy. However, alike drugs of this class, thiotepa is nonselective, which often results in its most important side effect: myelosuppression, the decreased activity of bone marrow. In turn, this can lead to leukopenia, thrombocytopenia, infection, and anemia. These side effects are often the most severe between 15 and 20 days following low dose treatment. Bone marrow has a high turn-over in the production of blood cells, which can be analogously inhibited by alkylating agents. This toxicity is dose-dependent and can be anticipated on. However, even a low dose can lead to life-threatening situations. Higher, and, therefore, more therapeutically effective, doses of thiotepa have successfully been applied by the autologous transplantation of bone marrow. In these high-dose therapies, the dose can be as much as a hundred times greater than that of conventional therapy. Despite the use of bone marrow transplantation, complications from the therapy can be fatal.

Monoalkylation of DNA leads to mispairing of bases and, if not repaired, can reside in the DNA sequence. Mutated DNA that does not undergo cell death can find its way into daughter cells and potentially cause genetic disorders such as cancer. As a result of cell mutation in the bone marrow, chemotherapies with alkylating agents are known to cause acute myeloid leukaemia (AML) and myelodysplastic syndrome (MDS).

=== Additional toxic effects ===
Apart from its mutagenic nature, thiotepa can exert skin toxicity, such as redness and hyperpigmentation. Other less frequent symptoms are peeling skin and mucositis. These effects can be unified under the term of "toxic erythema of chemotherapy". Due to thiotepa's excretion via sweat, skin exposure is especially high in regions with a high density of sweat glands. Namely, symptoms are more abundant at skin folds, the groin, armpits, and generally obstructed skin where accumulation of sweat can take place. The symptoms can be minimized by washing the skin with water and preventing the use of soap and moisturizers, together with preventing obstructions of the skin, 36 hours after thiotepa administration. Thiotepa's ability to cross the blood-brain barrier can lead to diseases related to the white brain matter and neurotoxic symptoms such as memory deficits, dizziness, blurred vision, and others. Additionally, neurotoxicity and mucositis are the main dose-limiting factors in high-dose treatment (whereas the main dose-limiting factor, myelosuppression, is remedied by applying transplantation of bone marrow). Other general adverse effects of chemotherapy with thiotepa are infections, diarrhea, nausea, vomiting, oedema and hair loss.

In-vivo experiments in animals displayed additional and potentially important toxicities. Thiotepa has been found to negatively affect fertility in male and female mice by interfering with spermatogenesis and impairing ovarian function, respectively. It was found to be teratogenic in mice and rats and fetolethal in rabbits. These effects were seen at doses lower than those used in humans. The LD_{50} of thiotepa via oral administration is 38 mg/kg in mice and 2,3 mg/kg in rats. For intravenous and intra-arterial injection in rats, the LD_{50} values are 9,5 mg/kg and 8,8 mg/kg, respectively.

Women and men of childbearing potential have to use effective contraception during treatment. A pregnancy test should be performed before treatment is started. Men should not father a child during and a year after cessation of treatment. There is no data on the administration of thiotepa during pregnancy, But as in-vivo animal experiments showed teratogenic effects the use of thiotepa during pregnancy is contraindicated. It is not known whether thiotepa is excreted in human breast milk, but due to its high lipophilicity, this cannot be ruled out. Due to its pharmacological properties and potential for toxicity in newborns/infants breast feeding is contraindicated during treatment with thiotepa.

== Drug interactions ==
Thiotepa can have various interactions with other medications or therapies that can impact patient safety and treatment efficacy. Aprepitant, a drug that prevents nausea and vomiting that may occur during chemotherapy, inhibits CYP-enzymes, which decrease the metabolism of thiotepa to tepa. Its importance is relatively minor because inhibition itself is small and due to the variability of thiotepa clearance in different individuals. The anti-seizure medication phenytoin induces the CYP3A4 enzyme. This leads to an increased rate of tepa formation from thiotepa, which highly influences its clearance and concentration. Higher local concentrations of the more reactive tepa can potentially induce hepatotoxicity. Additionally, cytotoxic drugs such as thiotepa can reduce the absorption of phenytoin leading to the increased risk of seizures. It is advised to avoid the use of both drugs simultaneously or decrease thiotepa doses.

Myelosuppressive/myelotoxic agents such as melphalan, busulfan, treosulfan, and cyclophosphamide, as well as the concurrent use of thiotepa, may increase the risk of hematologic adverse reactions and pulmonary toxicity, as they share similar toxicity profiles. Additionally, the use of live attenuated vaccines (including yellow fever) poses a risk of systemic and potentially fatal infection, with the risk further heightened in patients who are already immunosuppressed due to their underlying disease. In general, thiotepa is a potent inhibitor of CYP2B6, which can lead to increased plasma levels of drugs that are substrates of this enzyme. In addition to this, it may reduce the levels of potentially active metabolites, such as 4-hydroxycyclophosphamide, from cyclophosphamide. Likewise, co-administration with inhibitors of thiotepa's metabolising enzymes can lead to increased thiotepa plasma concentrations. Finally, prolonged apnea has been reported by the administration of thiotepa and is thought to be a result of the inhibition of pseudocholinesterase by thiotepa. For this reason, inhibitors such as succinylcholine and pancuronium should be prevented during thiotepa administration to prevent respiratory failure.
