= Melphalan =

Chemical compound

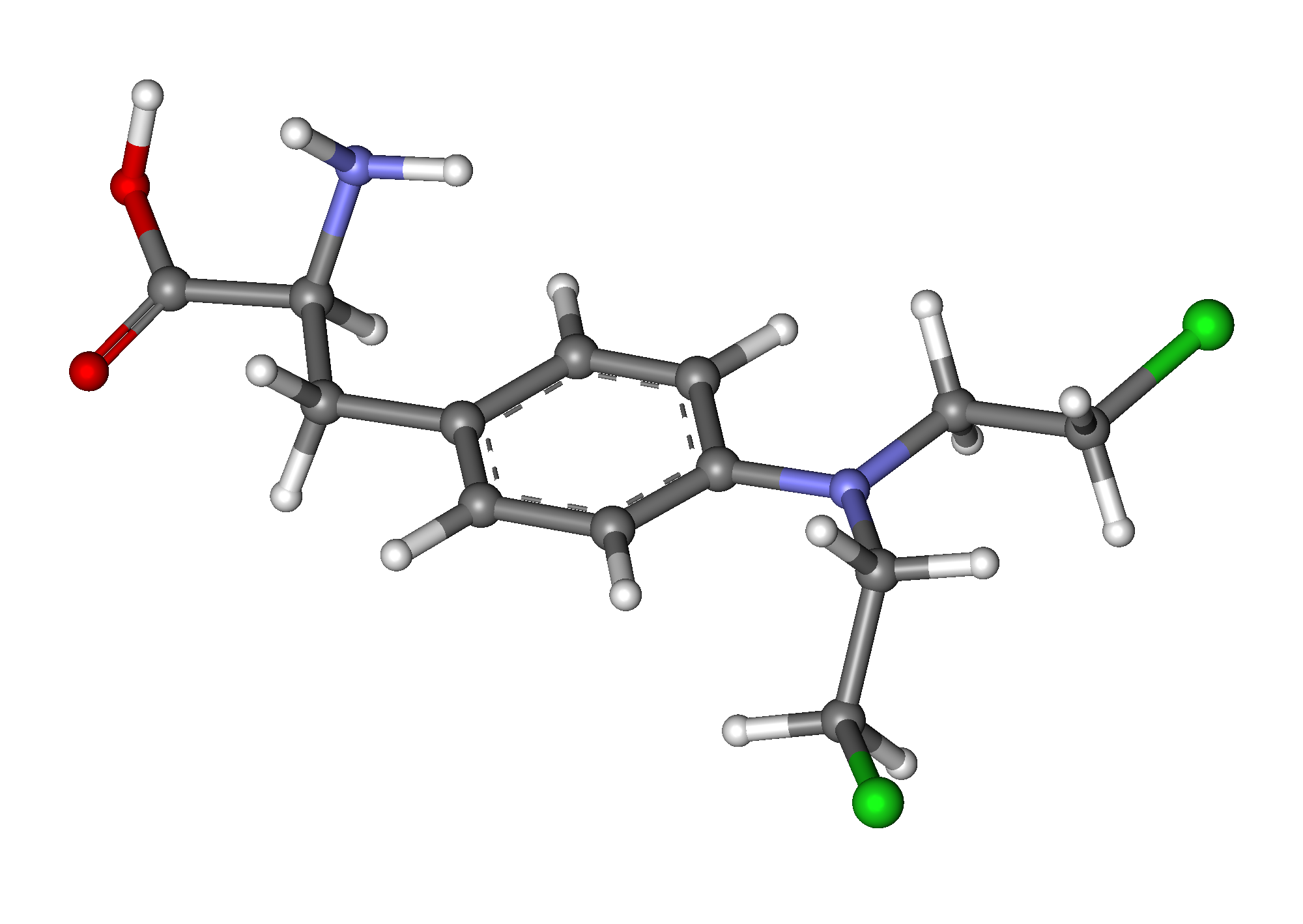

Clinical data
- Trade names: Alkeran, Evomela, Hepzato, Ivra, Phelinun, others
- Other names: (2S)-2-amino-3-{4-[bis(2-chloroethyl)amino]phenyl}propanoic acid, levopholan, L-sarkolysin
- AHFS/Drugs.com: Monograph
- MedlinePlus: a682220
- License data: US DailyMed: Melphalan
- Routes of administration: By mouth, intravenous, intra-arterial
- ATC code: L01AA03 (WHO)

Legal status
- Legal status: AU: S4 (Prescription only); US: ℞-only; EU: Rx-only

Pharmacokinetic data
- Bioavailability: 25–89% (By mouth)
- Metabolism: Hydrolysis to inactive metabolites
- Elimination half-life: 1.5 ± 0.8 hours
- Excretion: Kidney (IV: 5.8–21.3%)

Identifiers
- IUPAC name: 4-[bis(2-Chloroethyl)amino]-L-phenylalanine
- CAS Number: 148-82-3
- PubChem CID: 460612
- IUPHAR/BPS: 7620
- DrugBank: DB01042
- ChemSpider: 405297
- UNII: Q41OR9510P
- KEGG: D00369
- ChEBI: CHEBI:28876
- ChEMBL: ChEMBL852
- CompTox Dashboard (EPA): DTXSID6020804
- ECHA InfoCard: 100.005.207

Chemical and physical data
- Formula: C_{13}H_{18}Cl_{2}N_{2}O_{2}
- Molar mass: 305.20 g·mol^{−1}
- 3D model (JSmol): Interactive image
- SMILES: c1cc(ccc1C[C@@H](C(=O)O)N)N(CCCl)CCCl
- InChI: InChI=1S/C13H18Cl2N2O2/c14-5-7-17(8-6-15)11-3-1-10(2-4-11)9-12(16)13(18)19/h1-4,12H,5-9,16H2,(H,18,19)/t12-/m0/s1; Key:SGDBTWWWUNNDEQ-LBPRGKRZSA-N

Melphalan, sold under the brand name Alkeran among others, is a chemotherapy medication used to treat multiple myeloma; malignant lymphoma; lymphoblastic and myeloblastic leukemia; childhood neuroblastoma; ovarian cancer; mammary adenocarcinoma; and uveal melanoma. It is taken by mouth or by injection into a vein.

Common side effects include nausea and bone marrow suppression. Other severe side effects may include anaphylaxis and the development of other cancers. Use during pregnancy may result in harm to the fetus. Melphalan belongs to the class of nitrogen mustard alkylating agents. It works by interfering with the creation of DNA and RNA.

Melphalan was approved for medical use in the United States in 1964. It is on the World Health Organization's List of Essential Medicines. It is available as a generic medication.

== Medical uses ==
In the European Union, melphalan is indicated for the treatment of multiple myeloma; malignant lymphoma (Hodgkin, non-Hodgkin lymphoma); acute lymphoblastic and myeloblastic leukemia; childhood neuroblastoma; ovarian cancer; and mammary adenocarcinoma.

In the United States, melphalan is used as a high-dose conditioning treatment prior to hematopoietic progenitor (stem) cell transplantation in people with multiple myeloma. In the European Union, it is indicated, in combination with other cytotoxic medicinal products, as reduced intensity conditioning treatment prior to allogeneic haematopoietic stem cell transplantation in malignant haematological diseases in adults.

In August 2023, the US Food and Drug Administration approved melphalan (Hepzato) as a liver-directed treatment for adults with uveal melanoma with unresectable hepatic metastases affecting less than 50% of the liver and no extrahepatic disease, or extrahepatic disease limited to the bone, lymph nodes, subcutaneous tissues, or lung that is amenable to resection or radiation.

== Side effects ==
Common side effects include:

- Nausea
- Bone marrow suppression, including
  - Decreased white blood cell count causing increased risk of infection
  - Decreased platelet count causing increased risk of bleeding

Less common side effects include:

- Severe allergic reactions
- Pulmonary fibrosis (scarring of lung tissue) including fatal outcomes (usually only with prolonged use)
- Hair loss
- Interstitial pneumonitis
- Rash
- Itching
- Irreversible bone marrow failure due to melphalan not being withdrawn early enough
- Cardiac arrest

== Pharmacology ==
=== Pharmacokinetics ===
Melphalan is transported into cancer cells by L-leucine-type transporters (LAT1 and LAT2).

Metabolites of melphalan – mono- and dihydroxymelphalan – are pharmacologically inactive. They are created by a substitution of the chlorine atom with a hydroxyl group.

=== Mechanism of action ===
The alkylation mechanism of melphalan is shared by all nitrogen mustards, proceeding through the formation of an aziridinium cation. This highly reactive intermediate interacts with nitrogen atoms in nucleotide bases, generating positively charged adducts.

Melphalan chemically modifies DNA nucleotides through alkylation, primarily targeting guanine at the N7 position within the major groove, and to a lesser extent adenine at the N3 position within the minor groove.

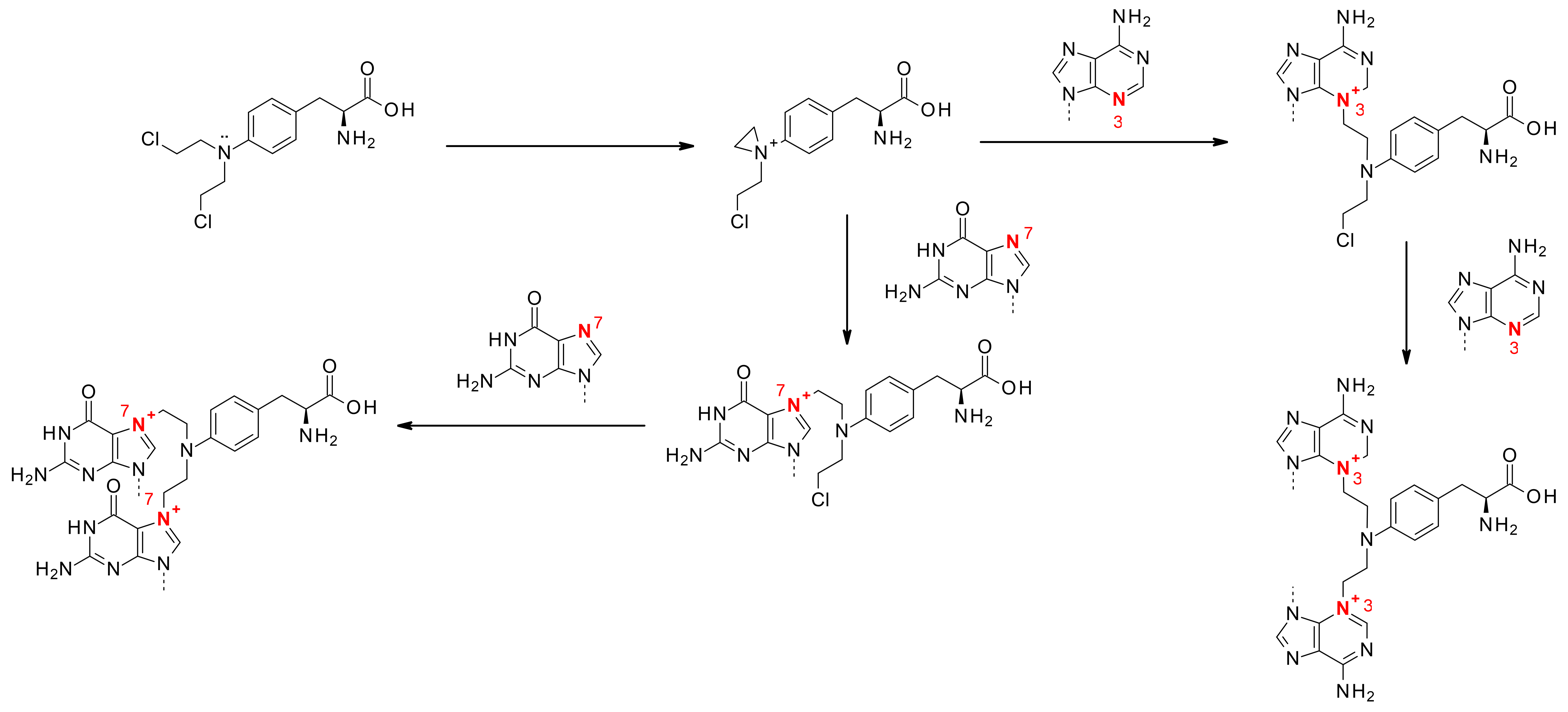
Mechanism of nucleotide alkylation by melphalan

Alkylation of guanine is the principal pharmacologically relevant event underlying melphalan’s therapeutic activity. This reaction produces crosslinks either between complementary DNA strands or within a single strand, typically involving guanine–guanine or adenine–adenine pairs. Such crosslinking disrupts DNA synthesis and RNA synthesis, processes essential for cell survival, leading to cytotoxicity in both dividing and non-dividing tumor cells.

== Synthesis ==
Syntheses: U.S. patent 3,032,584; U.S. patent 3,032,585 (both 1962 to NRDC).

4-Nitro-L-phenylalanine (1) was converted to its phthalimide by heating with phthalic anhydride, and this was converted to its ethyl ester (2). Catalytic hydrogenation produced the corresponding aniline. Heating in acid with oxirane, followed by treatment with phosphorus oxychloride provided the bischloride, and removal of the protecting groups by heating in hydrochloric acid gave melphalan (3).

== Society and culture ==
=== Legal status ===
On 17 September 2020, the Committee for Medicinal Products for Human Use (CHMP) of the European Medicines Agency (EMA) adopted a positive opinion, recommending the granting of a marketing authorization for melphalan. The applicant for this medicinal product is Adienne S.r.l. S.U. Melphalan was approved for medical use in the European Union in November 2020.
