= George Lopez (disambiguation) =

George Lopez (born 1961) is an American comedian, actor, and talk show host.

George Lopez may also refer to:

== People ==
- George Lopez (record label owner), American record label owner
- George López (1900–1993), Mexican woodcarver
- George A. Lopez (fl. from 1975), American academic
- George "Doc" Lopez, American health care chief executive

== Television ==
- George Lopez (TV series), a TV series starring the comedian
  - George Lopez (character)
