= ICU Medical =

Medical technology company

ICU Medical, Inc.
- Type: Public
- Traded as: Nasdaq: ICUI; S&P 600 component
- Founded: 1984; 42 years ago
- Headquarters: San Clemente, California, United States
- Products: Infusion pumps, solutions, sets, and needlefree connectors; critical care monitoring products and systems; oncology drug delivery systems
- Revenue: $2.28 billion (2022 est)
- Number of employees: Approximately 12,000
- Website: icumed.com

ICU Medical, Inc. is a medical technology company based in San Clemente, California. ICU Medical products are designed to prevent bloodstream infections and protect healthcare workers from exposure to infectious diseases or hazardous drugs. ICU Medical product line includes intravenous therapy (IV) products, pumps, needle-free vascular access devices, custom infusion sets, closed system hazardous drug handling devices and systems, sensor catheters, needle-free closed blood sampling systems, and hemodynamic monitoring systems.

In 2014 ICU Medical was named one of the 100 Most Trustworthy Companies in America by Forbes Magazine.

== History ==
The company was founded in 1984 by George "Doc" Lopez, MD who developed a product known as the ClickLock to better secure IV lines.

In 2006, ICU Medical introduced its first products for oncology. The ChemoClave system from ICU Medical is a closed system transfer device (CSTD) that allows pharmacists and nurses to safely mix and administer hazardous drugs used to treat cancer patients without exposing themselves to these drugs.

ICU Medical acquired the former Abbott Laboratories Critical Care business from Hospira in 2009 following a four-year business arrangement in which ICU acted as the manufacturer of the Hospira critical care product line.

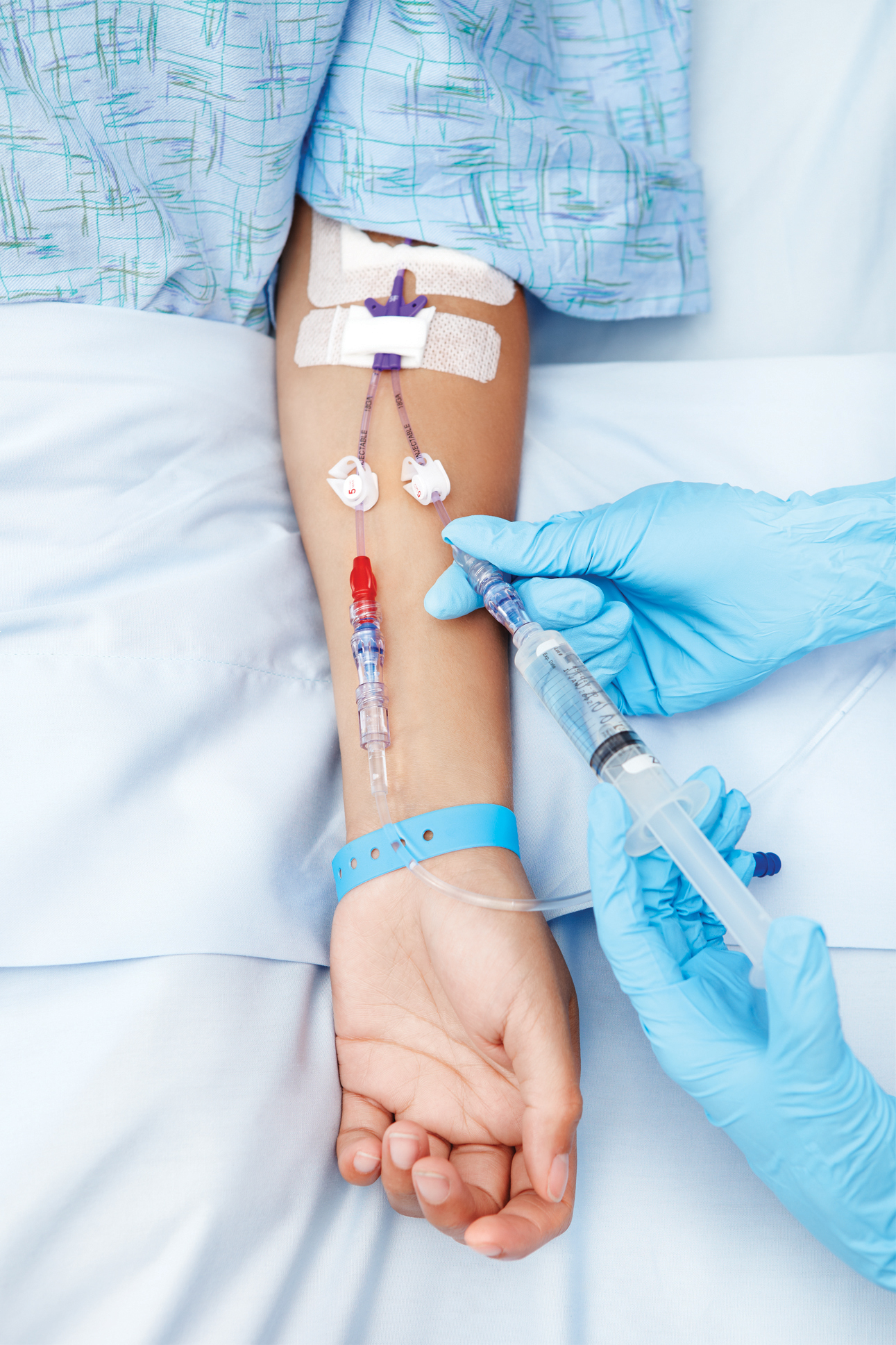
Infusion Therapy: ICU Medical provides a line of needle-free IV connectors including the Neutron Catheter Patency Device (above) as well as a line of custom and stock IV sets.

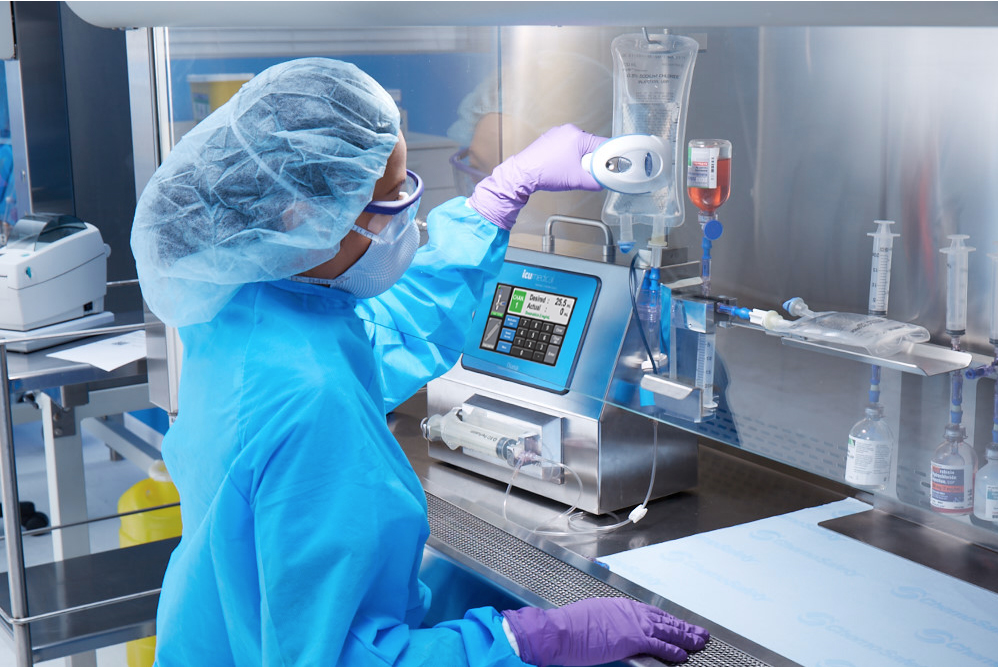
Oncology: The Diana Hazardous Drug Compounding System is the latest advance from ICU Medical for the safe handling of hazardous drugs used to treat many forms of cancer.

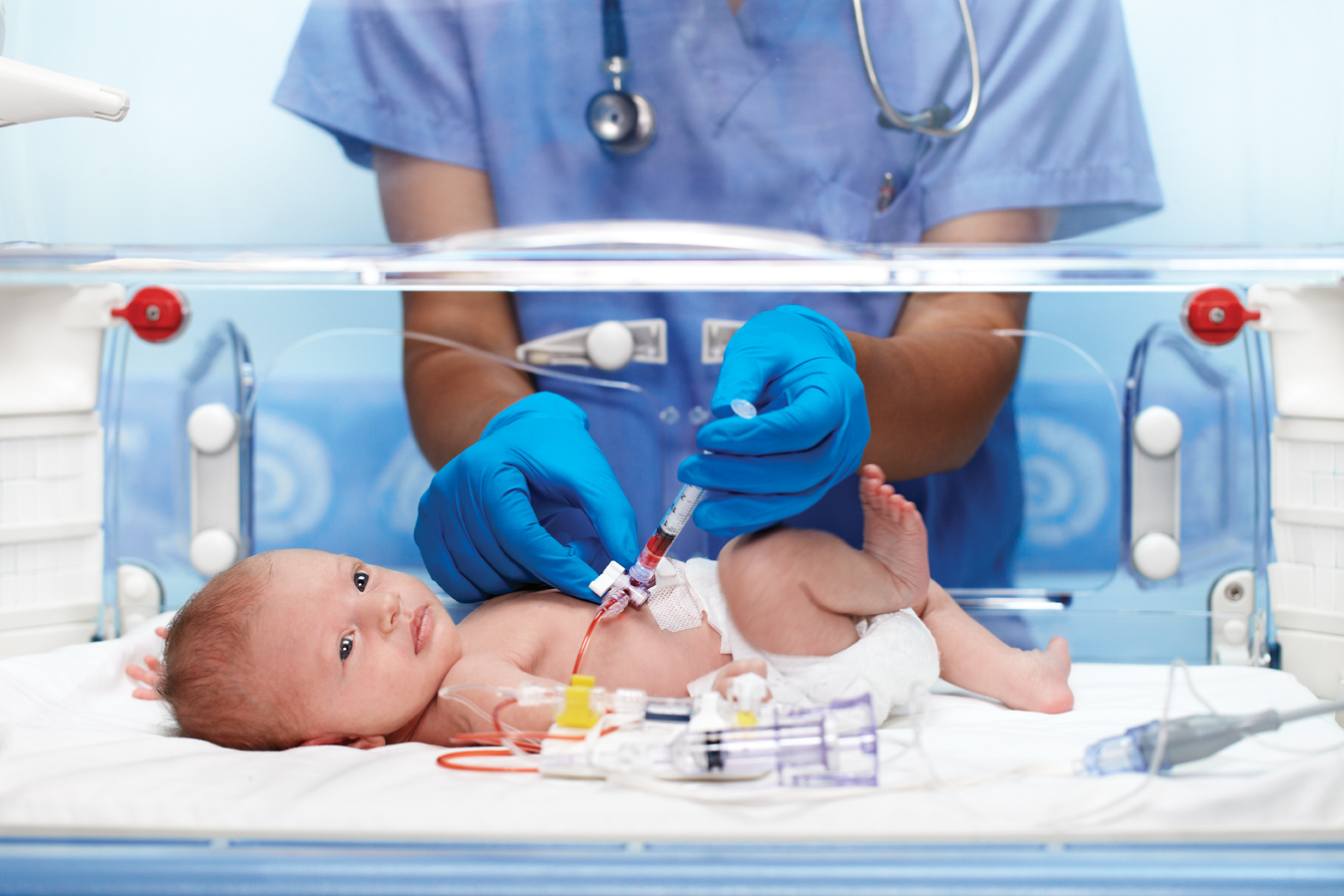
Critical Care: The SafeSet Closed Blood Sampling System from ICU Medical helps clinicians conserve blood in the operating room and intensive care unit.

In February 2017 ICU Medical also acquired the Hospira Infusion Systems business from Pfizer.

== Products ==
ICU Medical's Neutron device aims to reduce catheter occlusion caused by external factors such as connecting and disconnecting a luer, or patient vascular pressure changes caused by coughing, sneezing, crying or vomiting.

In 2015, ICU Medical acquired Excelsior Medical Corporation, a manufacturer of healthcare devices used to disinfect and protect access into a patient's bloodstream. Acquired products included the SwabCap and SwabFlush, as well as pre-filled saline and heparin flush syringes. The total purchase price for Excelsior was $59.5 million, however ICU immediately sold the operating assets of SwabFlush and pre-filled syringe businesses to Medline Industries, Inc. for $27 million.

=== Oncology ===
ICU Medical's oncology product line is designed specifically to keep healthcare workers and patients safe from exposure to hazardous drugs. In 2012, the company introduced the Diana Hazardous drug compounding system, a user-controlled automated system that helps protect clinicians from exposure to hazardous drugs and accidental needlesticks while protecting the patient preparation from exposure to environmental contaminants.

=== Critical care ===
ICU Medical's line of critical care products provides real-time hemodynamic monitoring, blood conservation solutions, oximetry catheter technology that helps optimize oxygen supply and demand, critical care catheters with no natural rubber latex components, and hemodynamic transducer kits.
