= CSTD =

CSTD may refer to:

- United Nations Commission on Science and Technology for Development
- Closed system drug transfer device
