= Chemotherapy =

Treatment of cancer using drugs that inhibit cell division or kill cells

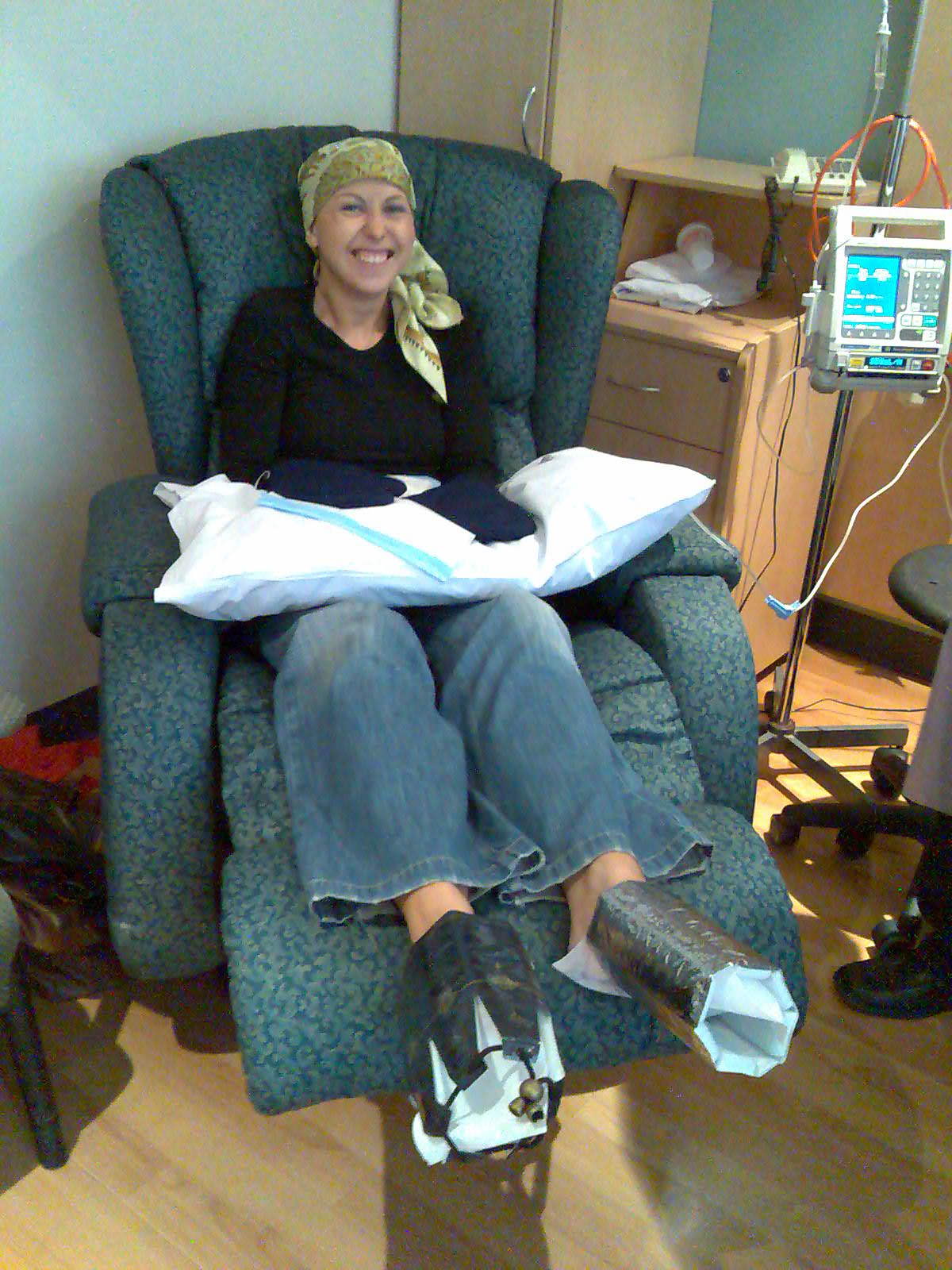
- A woman being treated with docetaxel chemotherapy for breast cancer. Cold mittens and booties are placed on her hands and feet to protect the nerves there, reducing the risk of neuropathy.
- Other names: chemo, CTX, CTx

Chemotherapy (often abbreviated chemo, sometimes CTX and CTx) is the type of cancer treatment that uses one or more anti-cancer drugs (chemotherapeutic agents or alkylating agents) in a standard regimen. Chemotherapy may be given with a curative intent (which almost always involves combinations of drugs), or it may aim only to prolong life or to reduce symptoms (palliative chemotherapy). Chemotherapy is one of the major categories of the medical discipline specifically devoted to pharmacotherapy for cancer, which is called medical oncology.

The term chemotherapy now means the non-specific use of intracellular poisons to inhibit mitosis (cell division) or to induce DNA damage (so that DNA repair can augment chemotherapy). This meaning excludes the more-selective agents that block extracellular signals (signal transduction). Therapies with specific molecular or genetic targets, which inhibit growth-promoting signals from classic endocrine hormones (primarily estrogens for breast cancer and androgens for prostate cancer), are now called hormonal therapies. Other inhibitions of growth-signals, such as those associated with receptor tyrosine kinases, are targeted therapy.

The use of drugs (whether chemotherapy, hormonal therapy, or targeted therapy) is systemic therapy for cancer: they are introduced into the blood stream (the system) and therefore can treat cancer anywhere in the body. Systemic therapy is often used with other, local therapy (treatments that work only where they are applied), such as radiation, surgery, and hyperthermia.

Traditional chemotherapeutic agents are cytotoxic by means of interfering with cell division (mitosis) but cancer cells vary widely in their susceptibility to these agents. To a large extent, chemotherapy can be thought of as a way to damage or stress cells, which may then lead to cell death if apoptosis is initiated. Many of the side effects of chemotherapy can be traced to damage to normal cells that divide rapidly and are thus sensitive to anti-mitotic drugs: cells in the bone marrow, digestive tract and hair follicles. This results in the most common side-effects of chemotherapy: myelosuppression (decreased production of blood cells, hence that also immunosuppression), mucositis (inflammation of the lining of the digestive tract), and alopecia (hair loss). Because of the effect on immune cells (especially lymphocytes), chemotherapy drugs often find use in a host of diseases that result from harmful overactivity of the immune system against self (so-called autoimmunity). These include rheumatoid arthritis, systemic lupus erythematosus, multiple sclerosis, vasculitis, malignant hypertension and many others.

== Treatment strategies ==
Common combination chemotherapy regimens
| Cancer type | Drugs | Acronym |
|---|---|---|
| Breast cancer | Cyclophosphamide, methotrexate, 5-fluorouracil, vinorelbine | CMF |
| Breast cancer | Doxorubicin, cyclophosphamide | AC |
| Hodgkin's lymphoma | Bleomycin, Etoposide, doxorubicin, cyclophosphamide, Vincristine, Procarbazine, Prednisone | BEACOPP |
| Hodgkin's lymphoma | Doxorubicin, bleomycin, vinblastine, dacarbazine | ABVD |
| Hodgkin's lymphoma | Mustine, vincristine, procarbazine, prednisolone | MOPP |
| Non-Hodgkin's lymphoma | Cyclophosphamide, doxorubicin, vincristine, prednisolone | CHOP, R-CVP |
| Germ cell tumor | Bleomycin, etoposide, cisplatin | BEP |
| Stomach cancer | Epirubicin, cisplatin, 5-fluorouracil | ECF |
| Stomach cancer | Epirubicin, cisplatin, capecitabine | ECX |
| Bladder cancer | Methotrexate, vincristine, doxorubicin, cisplatin | MVAC |
| Lung cancer | Cyclophosphamide, doxorubicin, vincristine, vinorelbine | CAV |
| Colorectal cancer | 5-fluorouracil, folinic acid, oxaliplatin | FOLFOX |
| Pancreatic cancer | Gemcitabine, 5-fluorouracil | FOLFOX |
| Bone cancer | Doxorubicin, cisplatin, methotrexate, ifosfamide, etoposide | MAP/MAPIE |

There are a number of strategies in the administration of chemotherapeutic drugs used today. Chemotherapy may be given with a curative intent or it may aim to prolong life or to palliate symptoms.

- Induction chemotherapy is the first line treatment of cancer with a chemotherapeutic drug. This type of chemotherapy is used for curative intent.
- Combined modality chemotherapy is the use of drugs with other cancer treatments, such as surgery, radiation therapy, or hyperthermia therapy.
- Consolidation chemotherapy is given after remission in order to prolong the overall disease-free time and improve overall survival. The drug that is administered is the same as the drug that achieved remission.
- Intensification chemotherapy is identical to consolidation chemotherapy but a different drug than the induction chemotherapy is used.
- Combination chemotherapy involves treating a person with a number of different drugs simultaneously. The drugs differ in their mechanism and side-effects. The biggest advantage is minimising the chances of resistance developing to any one agent. Also, the drugs can often be used at lower doses, reducing toxicity.
- Neoadjuvant chemotherapy is given prior to a local treatment such as surgery, and is designed to shrink the primary tumor. It is also given for cancers with a high risk of micrometastatic disease.
- Adjuvant chemotherapy is given after a local treatment (radiotherapy or surgery). It can be used when there is little evidence of cancer present, but there is risk of recurrence. It is also useful in killing any cancerous cells that have spread to other parts of the body. These micrometastases can be treated with adjuvant chemotherapy and can reduce relapse rates caused by these disseminated cells.
- Maintenance chemotherapy is a repeated low-dose treatment to prolong remission.
- Salvage chemotherapy or palliative chemotherapy is given without curative intent, but simply to decrease tumor load and increase life expectancy. For these regimens, in general, a better toxicity profile is expected.

All chemotherapy regimens require that the recipient be capable of undergoing the treatment. Performance status is often used as a measure to determine whether a person can receive chemotherapy, or whether dose reduction is required. Because only a fraction of the cells in a tumor die with each treatment (fractional kill), repeated doses must be administered to continue to reduce the size of the tumor. Current chemotherapy regimens apply drug treatment in cycles, with the frequency and duration of treatments limited by toxicity.

=== Effectiveness ===
The effectiveness of chemotherapy depends on the type of cancer and the stage. The overall effectiveness ranges from being curative for some cancers, such as some leukemias, to being ineffective, such as in some brain tumors, to being needless in others, like most non-melanoma skin cancers.

=== Dosage ===
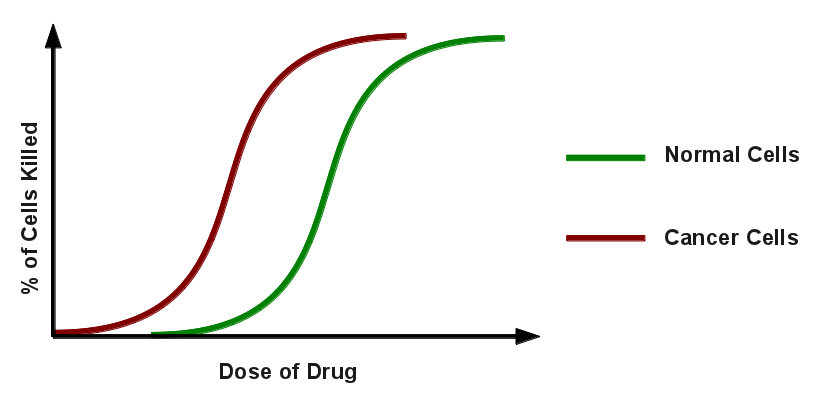
Dose response relationship of cell killing by chemotherapeutic drugs on normal and cancer cells. At high doses the percentage of normal and cancer cells killed is very similar. For this reason, doses are chosen where anti-tumour activity exceeds normal cell death.

Dosage of chemotherapy can be difficult: If the dose is too low, it will be ineffective against the tumor, whereas, at excessive doses, the toxicity (side-effects) will be intolerable to the person receiving it. The standard method of determining chemotherapy dosage is based on calculated body surface area (BSA). The BSA is usually calculated with a mathematical formula or a nomogram, using the recipient's weight and height, rather than by direct measurement of body area. This formula was originally derived in a 1916 study and attempted to translate medicinal doses established with laboratory animals to equivalent doses for humans. The study only included nine human subjects. When chemotherapy was introduced in the 1950s, the BSA formula was adopted as the official standard for chemotherapy dosing for lack of a better option.

The validity of this method in calculating uniform doses has been questioned because the formula only takes into account the individual's weight and height. Drug absorption and clearance are influenced by multiple factors, including age, sex, metabolism, disease state, organ function, drug-to-drug interactions, genetics, and obesity, which have major impacts on the actual concentration of the drug in the person's bloodstream. As a result, there is high variability in the systemic chemotherapy drug concentration in people dosed by BSA, and this variability has been demonstrated to be more than ten-fold for many drugs. In other words, if two people receive the same dose of a given drug based on BSA, the concentration of that drug in the bloodstream of one person may be 10 times higher or lower compared to that of the other person. This variability is typical with many chemotherapy drugs dosed by BSA, and, as shown below, was demonstrated in a study of 14 common chemotherapy drugs.

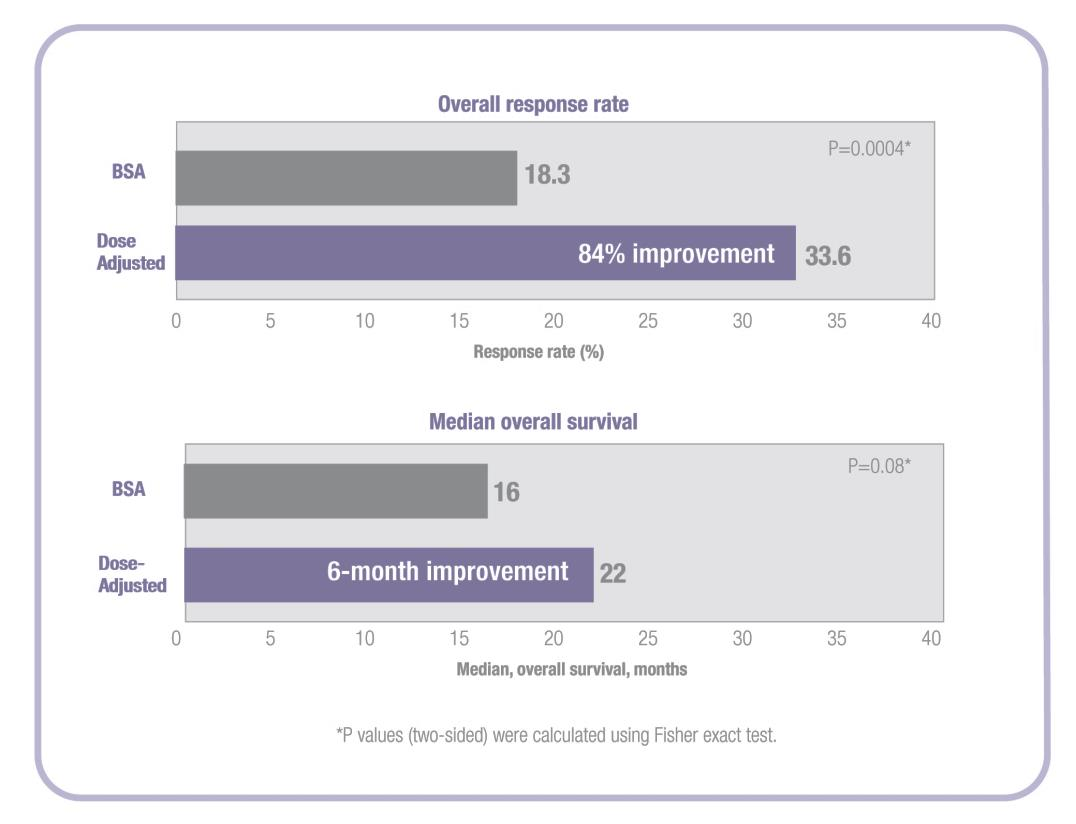
5-FU dose management results in significantly better response and survival rates versus BSA dosing.

The result of this pharmacokinetic variability among people is that many people do not receive the right dose to achieve optimal treatment effectiveness with minimized toxic side effects. Some people are overdosed while others are underdosed. For example, in a randomized clinical trial, investigators found 85% of metastatic colorectal cancer patients treated with 5-fluorouracil (5-FU) did not receive the optimal therapeutic dose when dosed by the BSA standard—68% were underdosed and 17% were overdosed.

There has been controversy over the use of BSA to calculate chemotherapy doses for people who are obese. Because of their higher BSA, clinicians often arbitrarily reduce the dose prescribed by the BSA formula for fear of overdosing. In many cases, this can result in sub-optimal treatment.

Several clinical studies have demonstrated that when chemotherapy dosing is individualized to achieve optimal systemic drug exposure, treatment outcomes are improved and toxic side effects are reduced. In the 5-FU clinical study cited above, people whose dose was adjusted to achieve a pre-determined target exposure realized an 84% improvement in treatment response rate and a six-month improvement in overall survival (OS) compared with those dosed by BSA.

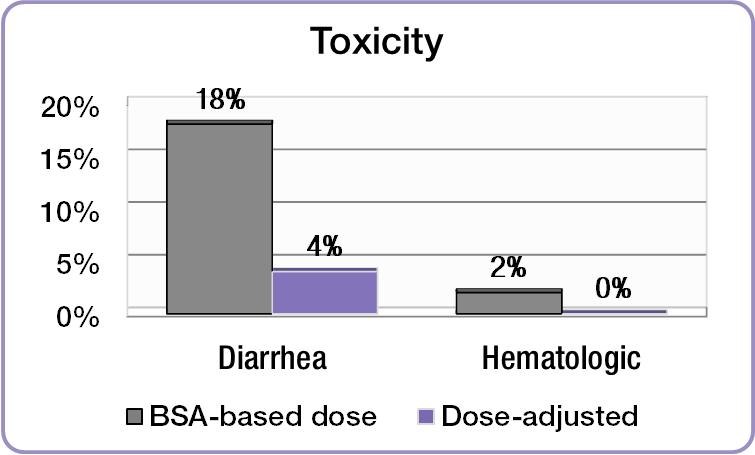
5-FU dose management avoids serious side effects experienced with BSA dosing.

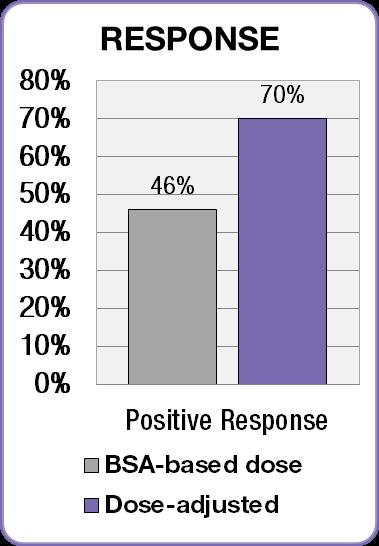

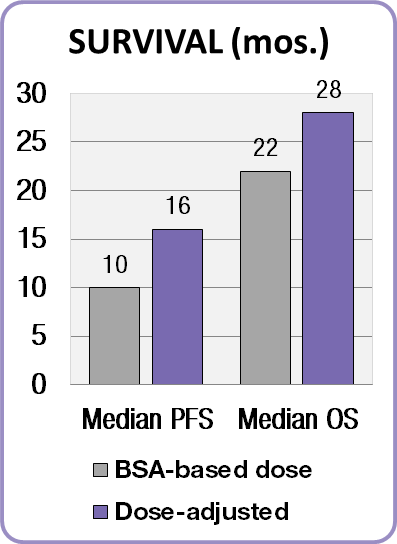
5-FU dose management in the FOLFOX regimen increases treatment response significantly and improves survival by six months.

In the same study, investigators compared the incidence of common 5-FU-associated grade 3/4 toxicities between the dose-adjusted people and people dosed per BSA. The incidence of debilitating grades of diarrhea was reduced from 18% in the BSA-dosed group to 4% in the dose-adjusted group and serious hematologic side effects were eliminated. Because of the reduced toxicity, dose-adjusted patients were able to be treated for longer periods of time. BSA-dosed people were treated for a total of 680 months while people in the dose-adjusted group were treated for a total of 791 months. Completing the course of treatment is an important factor in achieving better treatment outcomes.

Similar results were found in a study involving people with colorectal cancer who have been treated with the popular FOLFOX regimen. The incidence of serious diarrhea was reduced from 12% in the BSA-dosed group of patients to 1.7% in the dose-adjusted group, and the incidence of severe mucositis was reduced from 15% to 0.8%.

The FOLFOX study also demonstrated an improvement in treatment outcomes. Positive response increased from 46% in the BSA-dosed group to 70% in the dose-adjusted group. Median progression free survival (PFS) and overall survival (OS) both improved by six months in the dose adjusted group.

One approach that can help clinicians individualize chemotherapy dosing is to measure the drug levels in blood plasma over time and adjust dose according to a formula or algorithm to achieve optimal exposure. With an established target exposure for optimized treatment effectiveness with minimized toxicities, dosing can be personalized to achieve target exposure and optimal results for each person. Such an algorithm was used in the clinical trials cited above and resulted in significantly improved treatment outcomes.

Oncologists are already individualizing dosing of some cancer drugs based on exposure. Carboplatin and busulfan dosing rely upon results from blood tests to calculate the optimal dose for each person. Simple blood tests are also available for dose optimization of methotrexate, 5-FU, paclitaxel, and docetaxel.

The serum albumin level immediately prior to chemotherapy administration is an independent prognostic predictor of survival in various cancer types.

=== Types ===
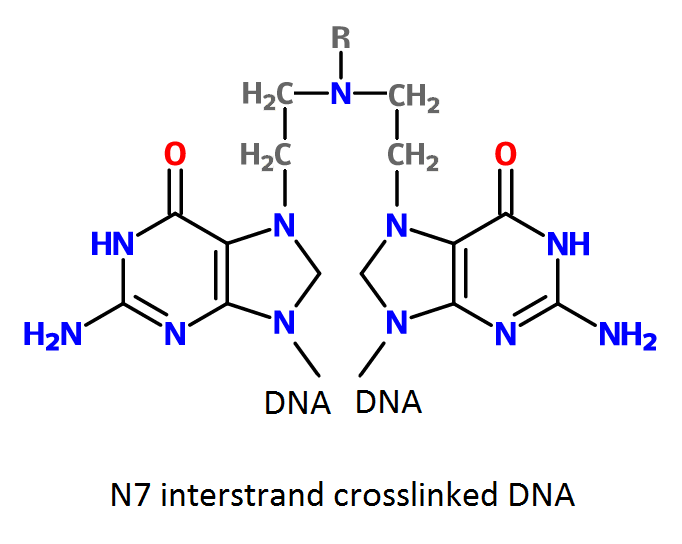
Two DNA bases that are cross-linked by a nitrogen mustard. Different nitrogen mustards will have different chemical groups (R). The nitrogen mustards most commonly alkylate the N7 nitrogen of guanine (as shown here) but other atoms can be alkylated.

==== Alkylating agents ====
Alkylating agents are the oldest group of chemotherapeutics in use today. Originally derived from mustard gas used in World War I, there are now many types of alkylating agents in use. They are so named because of their ability to alkylate many molecules, including proteins, RNA and DNA. This ability to bind covalently to DNA via their alkyl group is the primary cause for their anti-cancer effects. DNA is made of two strands and the molecules may either bind twice to one strand of DNA (intrastrand crosslink) or may bind once to both strands (interstrand crosslink). If the cell tries to replicate crosslinked DNA during cell division, or tries to repair it, the DNA strands can break. This leads to a form of programmed cell death called apoptosis. Alkylating agents will work at any point in the cell cycle and thus are known as cell cycle-independent drugs. For this reason, the effect on the cell is dose dependent; the fraction of cells that die is directly proportional to the dose of drug.

The subtypes of alkylating agents are the nitrogen mustards, nitrosoureas, tetrazines, aziridines, cisplatins and derivatives, and non-classical alkylating agents. Nitrogen mustards include mechlorethamine, cyclophosphamide, melphalan, chlorambucil, ifosfamide and busulfan. Nitrosoureas include N-Nitroso-N-methylurea (NMU), carmustine (BCNU), lomustine (CCNU) and semustine (MeCCNU), fotemustine and streptozotocin (STZ). Tetrazines include dacarbazine, mitozolomide and temozolomide. Aziridines include thiotepa, mitomycin and diaziquone (AZQ). Cisplatin and derivatives include cisplatin, carboplatin and oxaliplatin. They impair cell function by forming covalent bonds with the amino, carboxyl, sulfhydryl, and phosphate groups in biologically important molecules. Non-classical alkylating agents include procarbazine and hexamethylmelamine.

==== Antimetabolites ====
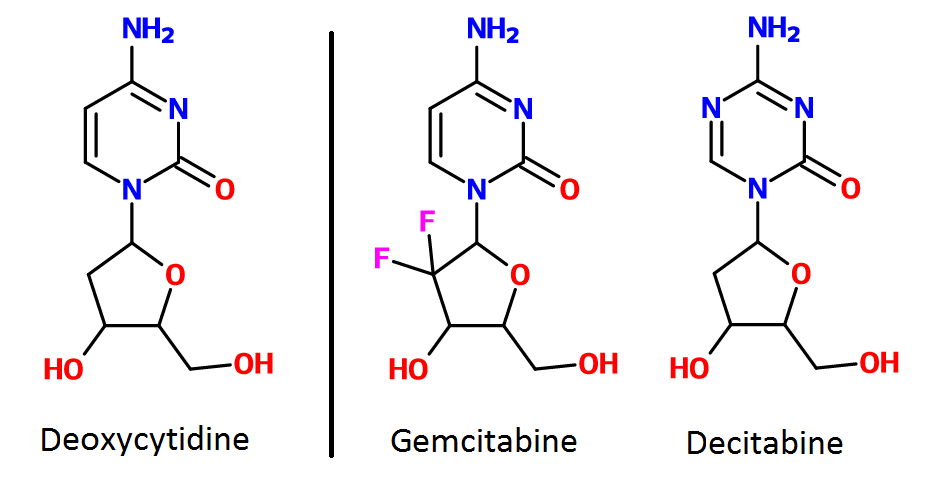
Deoxycytidine (left) and two anti-metabolite drugs (center and right), gemcitabine and decitabine. The drugs are very similar but they have subtle differences in their chemical structure.

Anti-metabolites are a group of molecules that impede DNA and RNA synthesis. Many of them have a similar structure to the building blocks of DNA and RNA. The building blocks are nucleotides; a molecule comprising a nucleobase, a sugar and a phosphate group. The nucleobases are divided into purines (guanine and adenine) and pyrimidines (cytosine, thymine and uracil). Anti-metabolites resemble either nucleobases or nucleosides (a nucleotide without the phosphate group), but have altered chemical groups. These drugs exert their effect by either blocking the enzymes required for DNA synthesis or becoming incorporated into DNA or RNA. By inhibiting the enzymes involved in DNA synthesis, they prevent mitosis because the DNA cannot duplicate itself. Also, after misincorporation of the molecules into DNA, DNA damage can occur and programmed cell death (apoptosis) is induced. Unlike alkylating agents, anti-metabolites are cell cycle dependent. This means that they only work during a specific part of the cell cycle, in this case S-phase (the DNA synthesis phase). For this reason, at a certain dose, the effect plateaus and proportionally no more cell death occurs with increased doses. Subtypes of the anti-metabolites are the anti-folates, fluoropyrimidines, deoxynucleoside analogues and thiopurines.

The anti-folates include methotrexate and pemetrexed. Methotrexate inhibits dihydrofolate reductase (DHFR), an enzyme that regenerates tetrahydrofolate from dihydrofolate. When the enzyme is inhibited by methotrexate, the cellular levels of folate coenzymes diminish. These are required for thymidylate and purine production, which are both essential for DNA synthesis and cell division. Pemetrexed is another anti-metabolite that affects purine and pyrimidine production, and therefore also inhibits DNA synthesis. It primarily inhibits the enzyme thymidylate synthase, but also has effects on DHFR, aminoimidazole carboxamide ribonucleotide formyltransferase and glycinamide ribonucleotide formyltransferase. The fluoropyrimidines include fluorouracil and capecitabine. Fluorouracil is a nucleobase analogue that is metabolised in cells to form at least two active products; 5-fluourouridine monophosphate (FUMP) and 5-fluoro-2'-deoxyuridine 5'-phosphate (fdUMP). FUMP becomes incorporated into RNA and fdUMP inhibits the enzyme thymidylate synthase; both of which lead to cell death. Capecitabine is a prodrug of 5-fluorouracil that is broken down in cells to produce the active drug. The deoxynucleoside analogues include cytarabine, gemcitabine, decitabine, azacitidine, fludarabine, nelarabine, cladribine, clofarabine, and pentostatin. The thiopurines include thioguanine and mercaptopurine.

==== Anti-microtubule agents ====
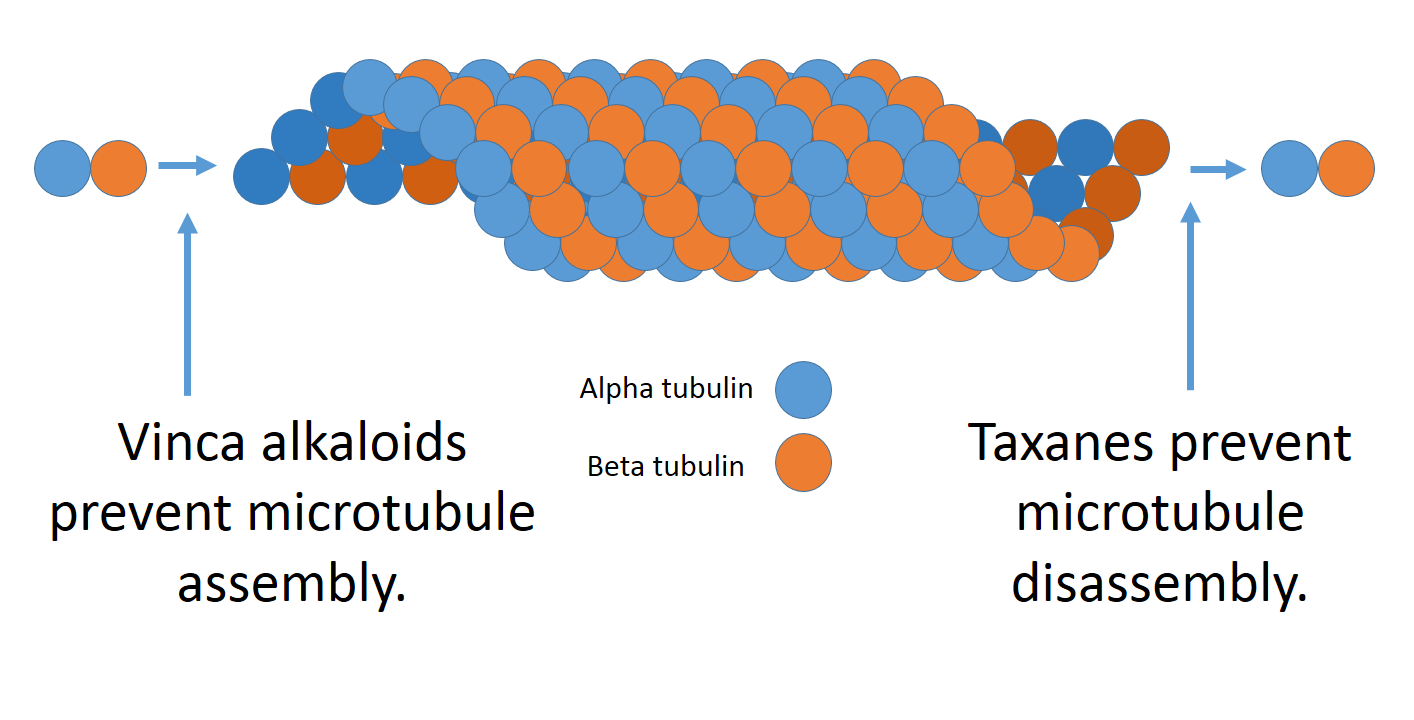
Vinca alkaloids prevent the assembly of microtubules, whereas taxanes prevent their disassembly. Both mechanisms cause defective mitosis.

Anti-microtubule agents, also known as mitotic inhibitors or antimitotic drugs, are plant-derived chemicals that block cell division by preventing microtubule function. Microtubules are an important cellular structure composed of two proteins, α-tubulin and β-tubulin. They are hollow, rod-shaped structures that are required for cell division, among other cellular functions. Microtubules are dynamic structures, which means that they are permanently in a state of assembly and disassembly. Vinca alkaloids and taxanes are the two main groups of anti-microtubule agents, and although both of these groups of drugs cause microtubule dysfunction, their mechanisms of action are completely opposite: Vinca alkaloids prevent the assembly of microtubules, whereas taxanes prevent their disassembly. By doing so, they can induce mitotic catastrophe in the cancer cells. Following this, cell cycle arrest occurs, which induces programmed cell death (apoptosis). These drugs can also affect blood vessel growth, an essential process that tumours utilise in order to grow and metastasise.

Vinca alkaloids are derived from the Madagascar periwinkle, Catharanthus roseus, formerly known as Vinca rosea. They bind to specific sites on tubulin, inhibiting the assembly of tubulin into microtubules. The original vinca alkaloids are natural products that include vincristine and vinblastine. Following the success of these drugs, semi-synthetic vinca alkaloids were produced: vinorelbine (used in the treatment of non-small-cell lung cancer), vindesine, and vinflunine. These drugs are cell cycle-specific. They bind to the tubulin molecules in S-phase and prevent proper microtubule formation required for M-phase.

Taxanes are natural and semi-synthetic drugs. The first drug of their class, paclitaxel, was originally extracted from Taxus brevifolia, the Pacific yew. Now this drug and another in this class, docetaxel, are produced semi-synthetically from a chemical found in the bark of another yew tree, Taxus baccata.

Podophyllotoxin is an antineoplastic lignan obtained primarily from the American mayapple (Podophyllum peltatum) and Himalayan mayapple (Sinopodophyllum hexandrum). It has anti-microtubule activity, and its mechanism is similar to that of vinca alkaloids in that they bind to tubulin, inhibiting microtubule formation. Podophyllotoxin is used to produce two other drugs with different mechanisms of action: etoposide and teniposide.

==== Topoisomerase inhibitors ====
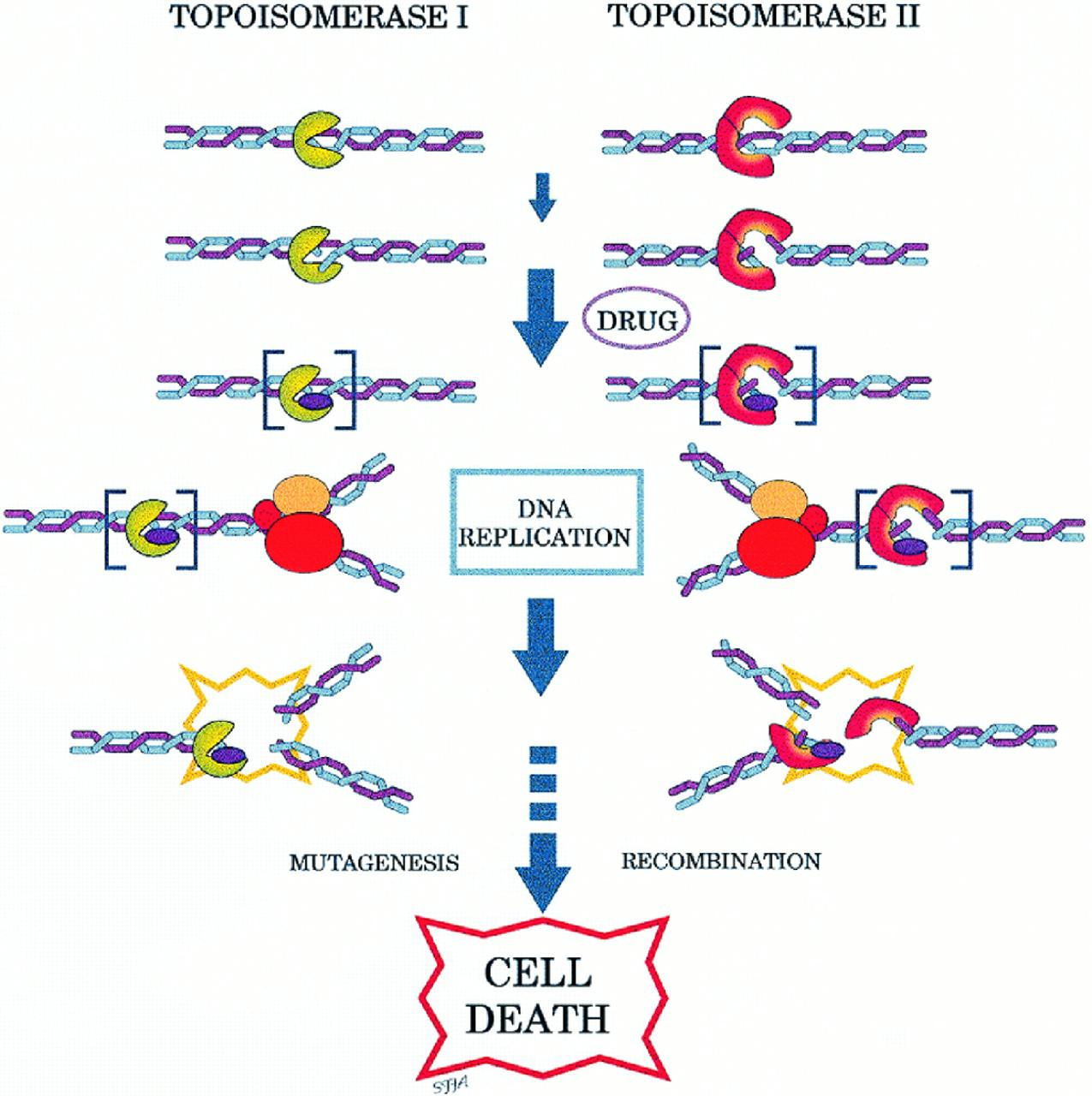
Topoisomerase I and II Inhibitors

Topoisomerase inhibitors are drugs that affect the activity of two enzymes: topoisomerase I and topoisomerase II. When the DNA double-strand helix is unwound, during DNA replication or transcription, for example, the adjacent unopened DNA winds tighter (supercoils), like opening the middle of a twisted rope. The stress caused by this effect is in part aided by the topoisomerase enzymes. They produce single- or double-strand breaks into DNA, reducing the tension in the DNA strand. This allows the normal unwinding of DNA to occur during replication or transcription. Inhibition of topoisomerase I or II interferes with both of these processes.

Two topoisomerase I inhibitors, irinotecan and topotecan, are semi-synthetically derived from camptothecin, which is obtained from the Chinese ornamental tree Camptotheca acuminata. Drugs that target topoisomerase II can be divided into two groups. The topoisomerase II poisons cause increased levels enzymes bound to DNA. This prevents DNA replication and transcription, causes DNA strand breaks, and leads to programmed cell death (apoptosis). These agents include etoposide, doxorubicin, mitoxantrone and teniposide. The second group, catalytic inhibitors, are drugs that block the activity of topoisomerase II, and therefore prevent DNA synthesis and translation because the DNA cannot unwind properly. This group includes novobiocin, merbarone, and aclarubicin, which also have other significant mechanisms of action.

==== Cytotoxic antibiotics ====
The cytotoxic antibiotics are a varied group of drugs that have various mechanisms of action. The common theme that they share in their chemotherapy indication is that they interrupt cell division. The most important subgroup is the anthracyclines and the bleomycins; other prominent examples include mitomycin C and actinomycin.

Among the anthracyclines, doxorubicin and daunorubicin were the first, and were obtained from the bacterium Streptomyces peucetius. Derivatives of these compounds include epirubicin and idarubicin. Other clinically used drugs in the anthracycline group are pirarubicin, aclarubicin, and mitoxantrone. The mechanisms of anthracyclines include DNA intercalation (molecules insert between the two strands of DNA), generation of highly reactive free radicals that damage intercellular molecules and topoisomerase inhibition.

Actinomycin is a complex molecule that intercalates DNA and prevents RNA synthesis.

Bleomycin, a glycopeptide isolated from Streptomyces verticillus, also intercalates DNA, but produces free radicals that damage DNA. This occurs when bleomycin binds to a metal ion, becomes chemically reduced and reacts with oxygen.

Mitomycin is a cytotoxic antibiotic with the ability to alkylate DNA.

=== Delivery ===
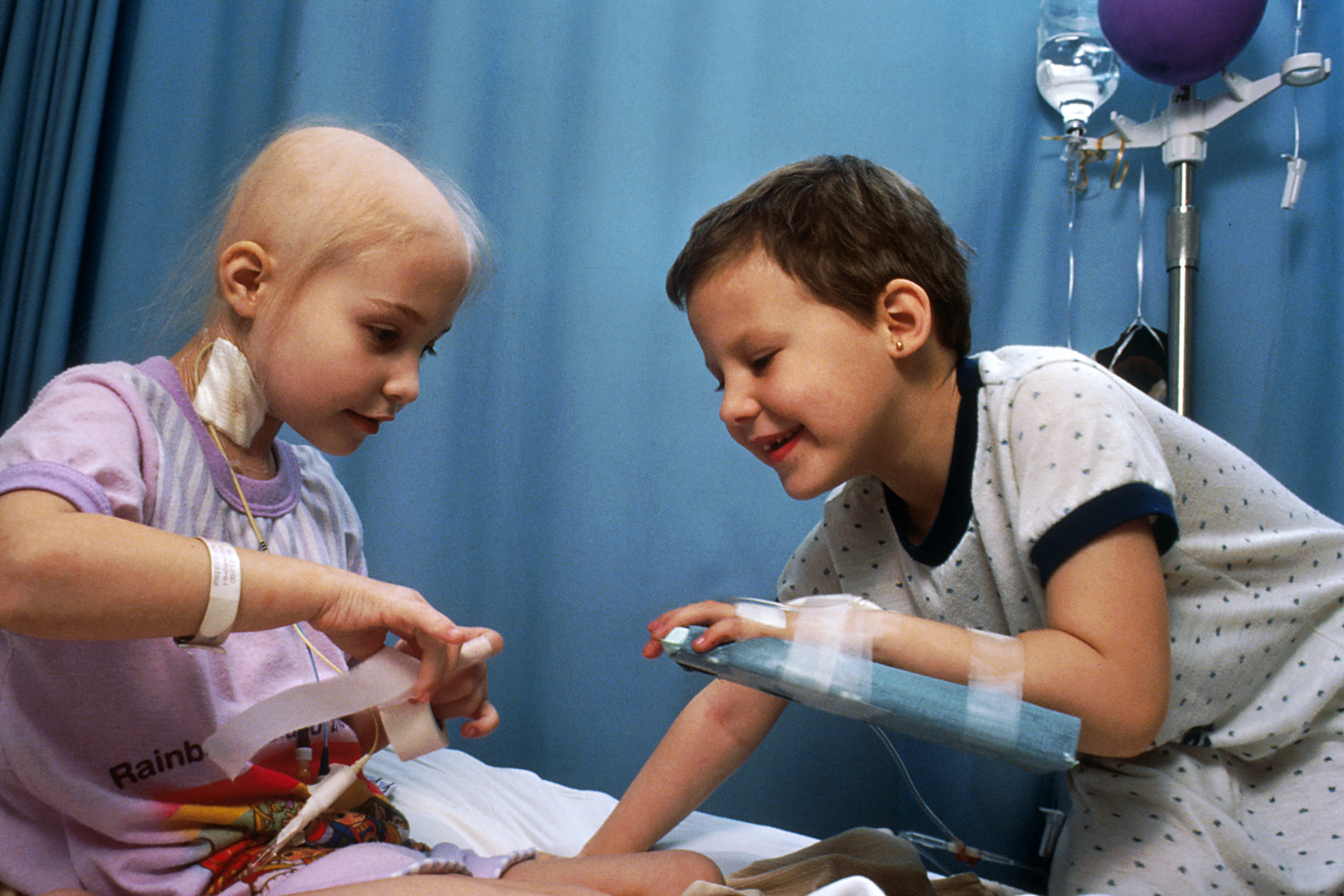
Two girls with acute lymphoblastic leukemia receiving chemotherapy. The girl on the left has a central venous catheter inserted in her neck. The girl on the right has a peripheral venous catheter. The arm board stabilizes the arm during needle insertion. Anti-cancer IV drip is seen at top right.

Most chemotherapy is delivered intravenously, although a number of agents can be administered orally (e.g., melphalan, busulfan, capecitabine). According to a recent (2016) systematic review, oral therapies present additional challenges for patients and care teams to maintain and support adherence to treatment plans.

There are many intravenous methods of drug delivery, known as vascular access devices. These include the winged infusion device, peripheral venous catheter, midline catheter, peripherally inserted central catheter (PICC), central venous catheter and implantable port. The devices have different applications regarding duration of chemotherapy treatment, method of delivery and types of chemotherapeutic agent.

Depending on the person, the cancer, the stage of cancer, the type of chemotherapy, and the dosage, intravenous chemotherapy may be given on either an inpatient or an outpatient basis. For continuous, frequent or prolonged intravenous chemotherapy administration, various systems may be surgically inserted into the vasculature to maintain access. Commonly used systems are the Hickman line, the Port-a-Cath, and the PICC line. These have a lower infection risk, are much less prone to phlebitis or extravasation, and eliminate the need for repeated insertion of peripheral cannulae.

Isolated limb perfusion (often used in melanoma), or isolated infusion of chemotherapy into the liver or the lung have been used to treat some tumors. The main purpose of these approaches is to deliver a very high dose of chemotherapy to tumor sites without causing overwhelming systemic damage. These approaches can help control solitary or limited metastases, but they are by definition not systemic, and, therefore, do not treat distributed metastases or micrometastases.

Topical chemotherapies, such as 5-fluorouracil, are used to treat some cases of non-melanoma skin cancer.

If the cancer has central nervous system involvement, or with meningeal disease, intrathecal chemotherapy may be administered.

== Adverse effects ==
Chemotherapeutic techniques have a range of side effects that depend on the type of medications used. The most common medications affect mainly the fast-dividing cells of the body, such as blood cells and the cells lining the mouth, stomach, and intestines. Chemotherapy-related iatrogenic toxicities can occur acutely after administration, within hours or days, or chronically, from weeks to years.

=== Immunosuppression and myelosuppression ===
Virtually all chemotherapeutic regimens can cause depression of the immune system, often by paralysing the bone marrow and leading to a decrease of white blood cells, red blood cells, and platelets. Anemia and thrombocytopenia may require blood transfusion. Neutropenia (a decrease of the neutrophil granulocyte count below 0.5 billion/litre) can be improved with synthetic G-CSF (granulocyte-colony-stimulating factor, e.g., filgrastim, lenograstim, efbemalenograstim alfa).

In very severe myelosuppression, which occurs in some regimens, almost all the bone marrow stem cells (cells that produce white and red blood cells) are destroyed, meaning allogenic or autologous bone marrow cell transplants are necessary. (In autologous BMTs, cells are removed from the person before the treatment, multiplied and then re-injected afterward; in allogenic BMTs, the source is a donor.) However, some people still develop diseases because of this interference with bone marrow.

Although people receiving chemotherapy are encouraged to wash their hands, avoid sick people, and take other infection-reducing steps, about 85% of infections are due to naturally occurring microorganisms in the person's own gastrointestinal tract (including oral cavity) and skin. Dental evaluation and treatment before cytotoxic chemotherapy is recommended for reducing the risk of oral and systemic infections during the neutropenic phase. This complication may manifest as systemic infections, such as sepsis, or as localized outbreaks, such as Herpes simplex, shingles, or other members of the Herpesviridea. The risk of illness and death can be reduced by taking common antibiotics such as quinolones or trimethoprim/sulfamethoxazole before any fever or sign of infection appears. Quinolones show effective prophylaxis mainly with hematological cancer. However, in general, for every five people who are immunosuppressed following chemotherapy who take an antibiotic, one fever can be prevented; for every 34 who take an antibiotic, one death can be prevented. Sometimes, chemotherapy treatments are postponed because the immune system is suppressed to a critically low level.

In Japan, the government has approved the use of some medicinal mushrooms like Trametes versicolor, to counteract depression of the immune system in people undergoing chemotherapy.

Trilaciclib is an inhibitor of cyclin-dependent kinase 4/6 approved for the prevention of myelosuppression caused by chemotherapy. The drug is given before chemotherapy to protect bone marrow function.

=== Neutropenic enterocolitis ===
Due to immune system suppression, neutropenic enterocolitis (typhlitis) is a "life-threatening gastrointestinal complication of chemotherapy." Typhlitis is an intestinal infection which may manifest itself through symptoms including nausea, vomiting, diarrhea, a distended abdomen, fever, chills, or abdominal pain and tenderness.

Typhlitis is a medical emergency. It has a very poor prognosis and is often fatal unless promptly recognized and aggressively treated. Successful treatment hinges on early diagnosis provided by a high index of suspicion and the use of CT scanning, nonoperative treatment for uncomplicated cases, and sometimes elective right hemicolectomy to prevent recurrence.

=== Gastrointestinal distress ===
Nausea, vomiting, anorexia, diarrhea, abdominal cramps, and constipation are common side-effects of chemotherapeutic medications that kill fast-dividing cells. Malnutrition and dehydration can result when the recipient does not eat or drink enough, or when the person vomits frequently, because of gastrointestinal damage. This can result in rapid weight loss, or occasionally in weight gain, if the person eats too much in an effort to allay nausea or heartburn. Weight gain can also be caused by some steroid medications. These side-effects can frequently be reduced or eliminated with antiemetic drugs. Low-certainty evidence also suggests that probiotics may have a preventative and treatment effect of diarrhoea related to chemotherapy alone and with radiotherapy. However, a high index of suspicion is appropriate, since diarrhoea and bloating are also symptoms of typhlitis, a very serious and potentially life-threatening medical emergency that requires immediate treatment.

=== Anemia ===
Anemia can be a combined outcome caused by myelosuppressive chemotherapy, and possible cancer-related causes such as bleeding, blood cell destruction (hemolysis), hereditary disease, kidney dysfunction, nutritional deficiencies or anemia of chronic disease. Treatments to mitigate anemia include hormones to boost blood production (erythropoietin), iron supplements, and blood transfusions. Myelosuppressive therapy can cause a tendency to bleed easily, leading to anemia. Medications that kill rapidly dividing cells or blood cells can reduce the number of platelets in the blood, which can result in bruises and bleeding. Extremely low platelet counts may be temporarily boosted through platelet transfusions and new drugs to increase platelet counts during chemotherapy are being developed. Sometimes, chemotherapy treatments are postponed to allow platelet counts to recover.

Fatigue may be a consequence of the cancer or its treatment, and can last for months to years after treatment. One physiological cause of fatigue is anemia, which can be caused by chemotherapy, surgery, radiotherapy, primary and metastatic disease or nutritional depletion. Aerobic exercise has been found to be beneficial in reducing fatigue in people with solid tumours.

=== Nausea and vomiting ===
Nausea and vomiting are two of the most feared cancer treatment-related side-effects for people with cancer and their families. In 1983, Coates et al. found that people receiving chemotherapy ranked nausea and vomiting as the first and second most severe side-effects, respectively. Up to 20% of people receiving highly emetogenic agents in this era postponed, or even refused potentially curative treatments. Chemotherapy-induced nausea and vomiting (CINV) are common with many treatments and some forms of cancer. Since the 1990s, several novel classes of antiemetics have been developed and commercialized, becoming a nearly universal standard in chemotherapy regimens, and helping to successfully manage these symptoms in many people. Effective mediation of these unpleasant and sometimes debilitating symptoms results in increased quality of life for the recipient and more efficient treatment cycles, as patients are less likely to avoid or refuse treatment.

=== Hair loss ===
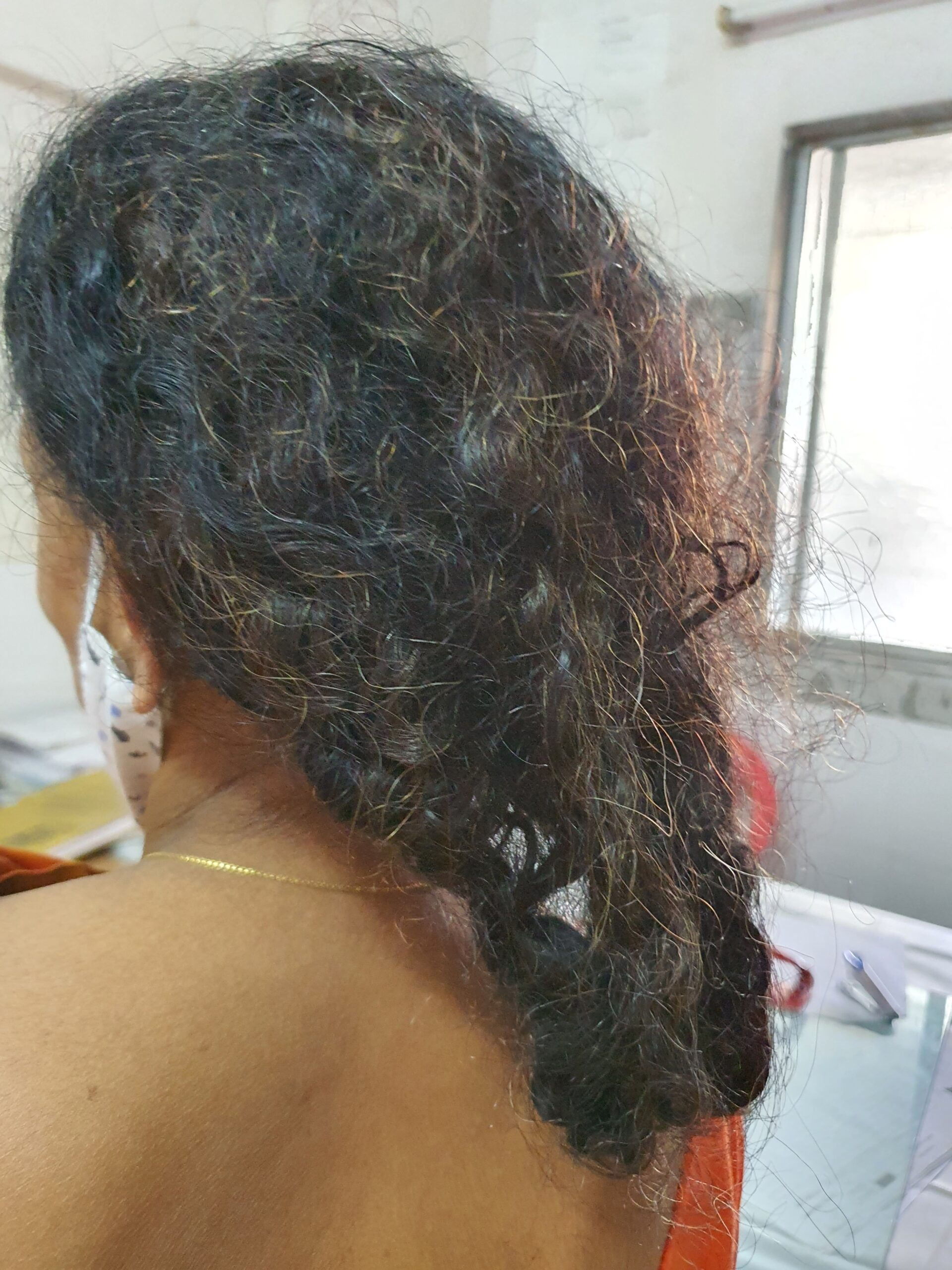
Hair matting after few sessions of chemotherapy

Chemotherapy curls

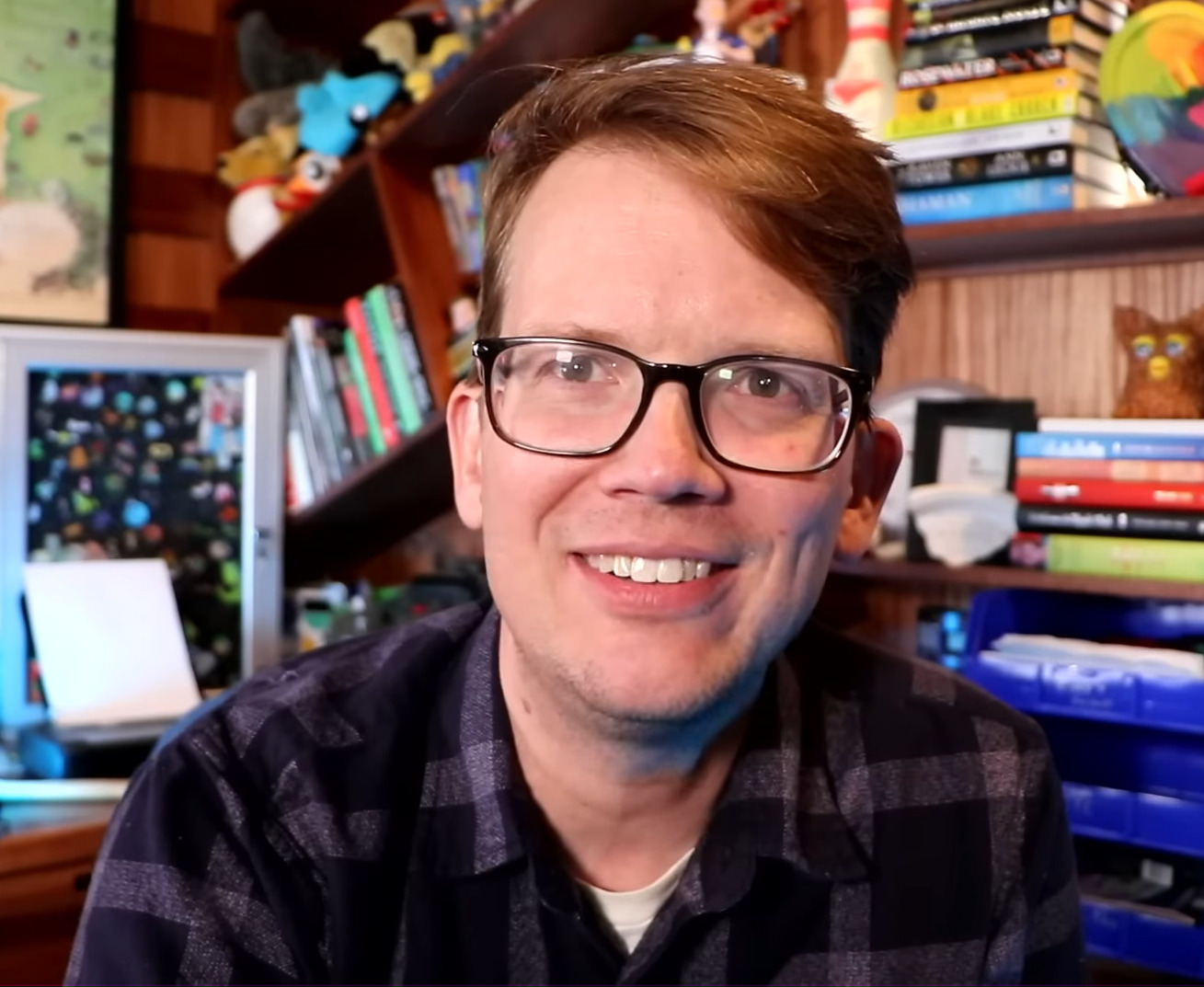
Hank Green just before the start of his chemotherapy treatment, with naturally straight hair

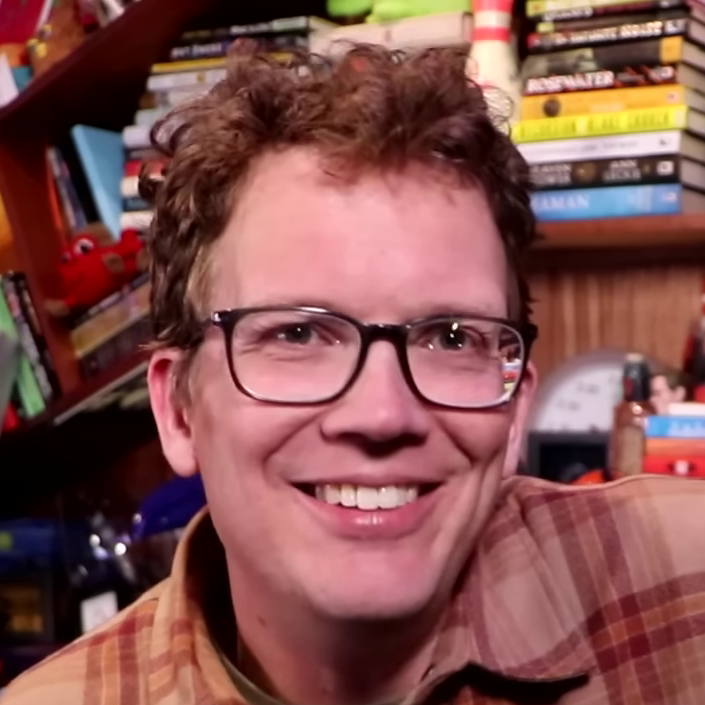
Green approximately a year later, after concluding chemotherapy, with chemotherapy-induced curls

Hair loss (alopecia) can be caused by chemotherapy that kills rapidly dividing cells; other medications may cause hair to thin. These are most often temporary effects: hair usually starts to regrow a few weeks after the last treatment, but sometimes with a change in color, texture, thickness or style. Sometimes hair has a tendency to curl after regrowth, resulting in "chemo curls." Severe hair loss occurs most often with drugs such as doxorubicin, daunorubicin, paclitaxel, docetaxel, cyclophosphamide, ifosfamide and etoposide. Valproate, a medication used to treat epilepsy, can also make the hair become curly for comparison. Permanent thinning or hair loss can result from some standard chemotherapy regimens.

Chemotherapy induced hair loss occurs by a non-androgenic mechanism, and can manifest as alopecia totalis, telogen effluvium, or less often alopecia areata. It is usually associated with systemic treatment due to the high mitotic rate of hair follicles, and more reversible than androgenic hair loss, although permanent cases can occur. Chemotherapy induces hair loss in women more often than men.

Scalp cooling offers a means of preventing both permanent and temporary hair loss; however, concerns about this method have been raised.

=== Secondary neoplasm ===
Development of secondary neoplasia after successful chemotherapy or radiotherapy treatment can occur. The most common secondary neoplasm is secondary acute myeloid leukemia, which develops primarily after treatment with alkylating agents or topoisomerase inhibitors. Survivors of childhood cancer are more than 13 times as likely to get a secondary neoplasm during the 30 years after treatment than the general population. Not all of this increase can be attributed to chemotherapy.

=== Infertility ===
Some types of chemotherapy are gonadotoxic and may cause infertility. Chemotherapies with high risk include procarbazine and other alkylating drugs such as cyclophosphamide, ifosfamide, busulfan, melphalan, chlorambucil, and chlormethine. Drugs with medium risk include doxorubicin and platinum analogs such as cisplatin and carboplatin. On the other hand, therapies with low risk of gonadotoxicity include plant derivatives such as vincristine and vinblastine, antibiotics such as bleomycin and dactinomycin, and antimetabolites such as methotrexate, mercaptopurine, and 5-fluorouracil.

Female infertility by chemotherapy appears to be secondary to premature ovarian failure by loss of primordial follicles. This loss is not necessarily a direct effect of the chemotherapeutic agents, but could be due to an increased rate of growth initiation to replace damaged developing follicles.

People may choose between several methods of fertility preservation prior to chemotherapy, including cryopreservation of semen, ovarian tissue, oocytes, or embryos. As more than half of cancer patients are elderly, this adverse effect is only relevant for a minority of patients. A study in France between 1999 and 2011 came to the result that embryo freezing before administration of gonadotoxic agents to females caused a delay of treatment in 34% of cases, and a live birth in 27% of surviving cases who wanted to become pregnant, with the follow-up time varying between 1 and 13 years.

Potential protective or attenuating agents include GnRH analogs, where several studies have shown a protective effect in vivo in humans, but some studies show no such effect. Sphingosine-1-phosphate (S1P) has shown similar effect, but its mechanism of inhibiting the sphingomyelin apoptotic pathway may also interfere with the apoptosis action of chemotherapy drugs.

In chemotherapy as a conditioning regimen in hematopoietic stem cell transplantation, a study of people conditioned with cyclophosphamide alone for severe aplastic anemia came to the result that ovarian recovery occurred in all women younger than 26 years at time of transplantation, but only in five of 16 women older than 26 years.

=== Teratogenicity ===
Chemotherapy is teratogenic during pregnancy, especially during the first trimester, to the extent that abortion usually is recommended if pregnancy in this period is found during chemotherapy. Second- and third-trimester exposure does not usually increase the teratogenic risk and adverse effects on cognitive development, but it may increase the risk of various complications of pregnancy and fetal myelosuppression.

Female patients of reproductive potential should use effective contraception during chemotherapy and for a few months after the last dose (e.g. 6 month for doxorubicin).

In males previously having undergone chemotherapy or radiotherapy, there appears to be no increase in genetic defects or congenital malformations in their children conceived after therapy. The use of assisted reproductive technologies and micromanipulation techniques might increase this risk. In females previously having undergone chemotherapy, miscarriage and congenital malformations are not increased in subsequent conceptions. However, when in vitro fertilization and embryo cryopreservation is practised between or shortly after treatment, possible genetic risks to the growing oocytes exist, and hence it has been recommended that the babies be screened.

=== Peripheral neuropathy ===
Between 30 and 40 percent of people undergoing chemotherapy experience chemotherapy-induced peripheral neuropathy (CIPN), a progressive, enduring, and often irreversible condition, causing pain, tingling, numbness and sensitivity to cold, beginning in the hands and feet and sometimes progressing to the arms and legs. Chemotherapy drugs associated with CIPN include thalidomide, epothilones, vinca alkaloids, taxanes, proteasome inhibitors, and the platinum-based drugs. Whether CIPN arises, and to what degree, is determined by the choice of drug, duration of use, the total amount consumed and whether the person already has peripheral neuropathy. Though the symptoms are mainly sensory, in some cases motor nerves and the autonomic nervous system are affected. CIPN often follows the first chemotherapy dose and increases in severity as treatment continues, but this progression usually levels off at completion of treatment. The platinum-based drugs are the exception; with these drugs, sensation may continue to deteriorate for several months after the end of treatment. Some CIPN appears to be irreversible. Pain can often be managed with drug or other treatment but the numbness is usually resistant to treatment.

=== Cognitive impairment ===
Some people receiving chemotherapy report fatigue or non-specific neurocognitive problems, such as an inability to concentrate; this is sometimes called post-chemotherapy cognitive impairment, referred to as "chemo brain" in popular and social media.

=== Tumor lysis syndrome ===
In particularly large tumors and cancers with high white cell counts, such as lymphomas, teratomas, and some leukemias, some people develop tumor lysis syndrome. The rapid breakdown of cancer cells causes the release of chemicals from the inside of the cells. Following this, high levels of uric acid, potassium and phosphate are found in the blood. High levels of phosphate induce secondary hypoparathyroidism, resulting in low levels of calcium in the blood. This causes kidney damage and the high levels of potassium can cause cardiac arrhythmia. Although prophylaxis is available and is often initiated in people with large tumors, this is a dangerous side-effect that can lead to death if left untreated.

=== Organ damage ===
Cardiotoxicity (heart damage) is especially prominent with the use of anthracycline drugs (doxorubicin, epirubicin, idarubicin, and liposomal doxorubicin). The cause of this is most likely due to the production of free radicals in the cell and subsequent DNA damage. Other chemotherapeutic agents that cause cardiotoxicity, but at a lower incidence, are cyclophosphamide, docetaxel and clofarabine.

Hepatotoxicity (liver damage) can be caused by many cytotoxic drugs. The susceptibility of an individual to liver damage can be altered by other factors such as the cancer itself, viral hepatitis, immunosuppression and nutritional deficiency. The liver damage can consist of damage to liver cells, hepatic sinusoidal syndrome (obstruction of the veins in the liver), cholestasis (where bile does not flow from the liver to the intestine) and liver fibrosis. Use of alcohol immediately after chemotherapy treatment can increase liver damage.

Nephrotoxicity (kidney damage) can be caused by tumor lysis syndrome and also due direct effects of drug clearance by the kidneys. Different drugs will affect different parts of the kidney and the toxicity may be asymptomatic (only seen on blood or urine tests) or may cause acute kidney injury.

Ototoxicity (damage to the inner ear) is a common side effect of platinum based drugs that can produce symptoms such as dizziness and vertigo. Children treated with platinum analogues have been found to be at risk for developing hearing loss.

=== Other side-effects ===
Less common side-effects include red skin (erythema), dry skin, damaged fingernails, a dry mouth (xerostomia), water retention, and sexual impotence. Some medications can trigger allergic or pseudoallergic reactions.

Specific chemotherapeutic agents are associated with organ-specific toxicities, including cardiovascular disease (e.g., doxorubicin), interstitial lung disease (e.g., bleomycin) and occasionally secondary neoplasm (e.g., MOPP therapy for Hodgkin's disease).

Hand-foot syndrome is another side effect to cytotoxic chemotherapy.

Nutritional problems are also frequently seen in cancer patients at diagnosis and through chemotherapy treatment. Research suggests that in children and young people undergoing cancer treatment, parenteral nutrition may help with this leading to weight gain and increased calorie and protein intake, when compared to enteral nutrition.

== Limitations ==
Chemotherapy does not always work, and even when it is useful, it may not completely destroy the cancer. People frequently fail to understand its limitations. In one study of people who had been newly diagnosed with incurable, stage 4 cancer, more than two-thirds of people with lung cancer and more than four-fifths of people with colorectal cancer still believed that chemotherapy was likely to cure their cancer.

The blood–brain barrier poses an obstacle to delivery of chemotherapy to the brain. This is because the brain has an extensive system in place to protect it from harmful chemicals. Drug transporters can pump out drugs from the brain and brain's blood vessel cells into the cerebrospinal fluid and blood circulation. These transporters pump out most chemotherapy drugs, which reduces their efficacy for treatment of brain tumors. Only small lipophilic alkylating agents such as lomustine or temozolomide are able to cross this blood–brain barrier.

Blood vessels in tumors are very different from those seen in normal tissues. As a tumor grows, tumor cells furthest away from the blood vessels become low in oxygen (hypoxic). To counteract this they then signal for new blood vessels to grow. The newly formed tumor vasculature is poorly formed and does not deliver an adequate blood supply to all areas of the tumor. This leads to issues with drug delivery because many drugs will be delivered to the tumor by the circulatory system.

== Resistance ==
Resistance is a major cause of treatment failure in chemotherapeutic drugs and results in cancer cell survival despite exposure to such toxins. Broadly, resistance types can be classified based on the points at which cancer cells are no longer susceptible to the effects of chemotherapeutic drugs. One form of resistance is known as primary, or natural resistance, where cancer cells possess innate mechanisms that allow them to be unresponsive to chemotherapeutic drug exposure from the very beginning of its administration. Contrarily, acquired resistance is characterized by an initial, brief period of cancer cell susceptibility to the applied chemotherapeutic agent, followed by later stages of poor drug response. Despite these differences between the points at which resistance emerges, either form can result in what is known as multi-drug resistance, essentially allowing cancer cells to evade the effects of both similarly and differently functioning chemotherapeutic drugs regardless of their previous exposure to them.

There are various contributors to emerging resistance in cancer, one of which is the presence of small pumps on the surface of cancer cells that actively transport concentrations of chemotherapy drugs from inside the cell to the outside, otherwise known as efflux pumps. However, these pumps are not unique characteristics of cancer cells whereas in normal functioning cells, efflux pumps are actually engaged in life-sustaining processes that help avoid the accumulation of waste and toxin absorption in the body. It is the over-expression of efflux pump proteins observed in resistant cancer cells that allows them to produce these pumps in high quantities and/or increase their overall activity compared to normal, sensitive cells. A specific protein and member of the ATP-binding cassette (ABC) transporter family known as p-glycoprotein (P-gp), has been suggested to play a major role in the development of resistance in cancer cells by promoting drug efflux. Research on P-gp and other related efflux pumps is currently ongoing, but studies have suggested that they have the capacity to transport various types of chemotherapeutic agents out of cancer cells resulting in a significantly reduced bioavailability of such drugs, and ultimately failed chemotherapy treatments. The inhibition of efflux pumps has been suggested as a promising therapeutic target to overcome this mechanism of resistance in cancer cells, aiming to both restore chemotherapeutic drug bioavailability within the cells, yet avoid deregulating normal functioning pumps and reduce undesired adverse effects. Conversely, toxic drug interactions have posed a major obstacle to successfully developing efflux pump inhibitors and highlights the difficulty of targeted chemotherapeutic drug formulation.

Many proteins involved in intracellular transport processes have been identified as fundamental contributors of resistance by impairing chemotherapeutic drug-target interactions. For example, lung resistance-related proteins, otherwise referred to as major vault proteins, are located on the nuclear membrane of cells and typically mediate nucleocytoplasmic transport. Here, the regulation of compounds between the nucleus and cytoplasm is a process that can be overexpressed by cancer cells to transport DNA-targeted chemotherapeutic drugs away from the nucleus, and essentially restrict these drugs from successfully interacting with their targets. Without reducing the total intracellular chemotherapeutic drug concentration, cancer cells have developed mechanisms to successfully dismantle drug-target interactions and confer resistance to multiple chemotherapeutic drugs. An additional mechanism of resistance interfering with drug-target interaction can be demonstrated by mutations in genes that encode for drug target proteins, such as tubulin. Broadly, tubulin proteins make up intracellular structures known as microtubules that play a fundamental role in cellular shape, division, signaling, and movement, thus making them a particular promising site of target for chemotherapeutic drugs. By altering or inhibiting microtubule dynamics in cancer cells, drugs can prohibit successfully cell division and induce the direct activation of adoptotic pathways. However, mutations that produce physical alterations in tubulin protein structure, can interfere with the several tubulin binding sites and inhibit the effective interaction and activity of these chemotherapeutic drugs.

Another major biological process and target of many chemotherapeutic drugs is the disruption of structures and genes involved in DNA replication, which would aim to reduce cancer cell proliferation and survival. However, through gene amplification, a resistance-inducing mechanism in which multiple copies of a gene are produced by cancer cells, the enhanced quantity of gene copy number limit the efficiency of such drugs, therefore allowing cancer cells to restore their proliferative ability and promote uncontrolled cell growth. A target enzyme known as topoisomerase II (Topo II) recognized for its fundamental role in detangling and repairing DNA, has also been proposed as a potentially promising site of action for drugs designed to induce DNA breakage. Here, it was suggested that the inhibition of Topo II would result in enzyme-mediated DNA breakage which without the proper functioning of repairment, would ultimately induce cell stress and apoptosis, or programmed cell death. As resistance to these Topo II poisons emerged, it was determined that cancer cells had developed mechanisms to reduce the expression of the Topo II enzyme, ultimately depriving these drugs from their targets and rendering them ineffective. Cancer cells have developed other resistance mechanisms to mediate the effects of chemotherapy-induced DNA breakage such as the activation of DNA damage repair (DDR) pathways which may recruit and upregulate various genes involved in DNA repair processes, thus countering the effects of many chemotherapeutic drugs.

An additional major contributor to chemotherapy resistance is inter and intra patient response variability. Inter, referring to differences between patients, and intra referring to differences within an individual patient. The oncology community recognizes inter-patient response variability as a wide-scale phenomenon of pressing concern as variability is even observed in tumors before exposure to targeted treatment. Inter and intra patient response variability further exacerbates the difficulties in ensuring long-term effectiveness of treatment where tumor growth does not progress and shrinkage is permanent. There are many factors at the cellular and genomic level that contribute to variability between patients and within the individual. In a more narrow scope of events, tumor heterogeneity and cellular heterogeneity are the two overarching contributors to this issue.

Tumor heterogeneity refers to the diversity of cells within the same tumor microenvironment. Regional and environmental differences within a tumor actively shape its heterogeneity and promote the growth and survival of tumor cells. Variation in oxygen availability, acidity, and growth factors in different regions of the tumor place different selective pressures in each region of the environment, leading to tumor cells with varying sensitivity within the same microenvironment. Additionally, distance from vascular beds in the tumor microenvironment creates an uneven distribution of the targeted drug to all cells in the tumor, failing to effectively kill all of the tumor cells. This phenomenon further promotes heterogeneity and produces a gradient in the microenvironment that fosters the positive selection of a drug-resistant cell population, where cells sensitive to treatment decrease in population size . Plasticity in tumor cells has, additionally, been recognized as a byproduct of tumor heterogeneity and a major contributor to resistance. Tumor cells have the ability to gain stem-like traits in response to changes in their microenvironment, allowing for the survival of cell populations, which ultimately promotes resistance through selection. Tumor cell plasticity is a notable mechanism of acquired resistance. In order to assess the potential reversibility of plasticity in tumor cells, mathematical models informed by tumor heterogeneity and inter-cellular differences have been created.

Cellular heterogeneity describes the recently studied phenomenon of genetically identical cells varying in phenotype, cellular response, and drug sensitivity. Cell-to-cell response variability has been attributed to random, stochastic biochemical processes that facilitate protein expression. These intracellular biochemical fluctuations create variation in genetically identical cells by producing unique proteomes and subsequently differing phenotypic responses to drugs even within the same environment. Fractional killing, (the incomplete growth inhibition of tumor cells) as mentioned as a result of tumor heterogeneity, is likely exacerbated by the fluctuations in the proteome and wide distribution of varying responsiveness in each cell, further combating the efforts of chemotherapy drugs.

== Cytotoxics and targeted therapies ==
Targeted therapies are a relatively new class of cancer drugs that can work to overcome many of the adverse effects seen with the use of cytotoxics. They are divided into two groups: small molecule and antibodies. The typical widespread toxicity observed with the use of cytotoxics is due to the lack of cell specificity of the drugs allowing them to kill any rapidly dividing cell, both cancerous and normal. Targeted therapies however, are designed to affect cellular proteins or processes that are utilized by the cancer cells. This allows a high dose administration to cancer tissues with a relatively low dose to other tissues. Although the side effects are often less severe than that seen of cytotoxic chemotherapeutics, life-threatening effects can occur. Initially, the targeted therapeutics were supposed to be solely selective for one protein. Now it is clear that there is often a range of protein targets that the drug can bind. An example target for targeted therapy is the BCR-ABL1 protein produced from the Philadelphia chromosome, a genetic lesion found commonly in chronic myelogenous leukemia and in some patients with acute lymphoblastic leukemia. This fusion protein has enzyme activity that can be inhibited by imatinib, a small molecule drug.

Another example of target therapy is fludarabine cyclophosphamide (FC) lymphodepletion therapy used in patients with B cell lymphoma. This anti-CD19 CAR-T cell therapy is commonly known to decrease CAR-T cells which bind to the glycoprotein CD19. By decreasing the number of CAR-T cells, it decreases the activation of infected B cells. Subsequently, it increases the availability of cytokines, which promotes the survival of transferred T cells. However, there is one case where the target therapy revitalized the CAR-T cells and contributed to the treatment of relapsed B cell lymphoma.

== Mechanism of action ==
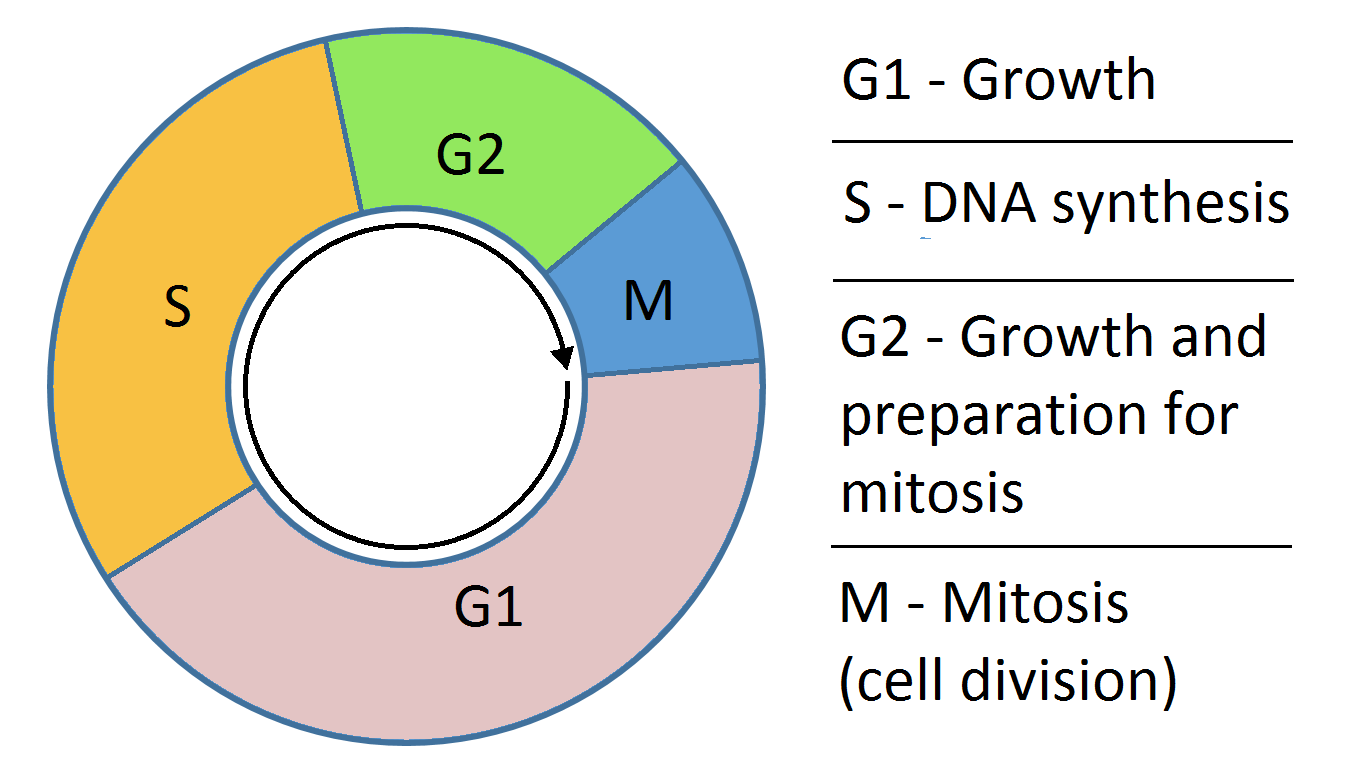
The four phases of the cell cycle. G1 – the initial growth phase. S – the phase in which DNA is synthesised. G2 – the second growth phase in preparation for cell division. M – mitosis; where the cell divides to produce two daughter cells that continue the cell cycle.

Cancer is the uncontrolled growth of cells coupled with malignant behaviour: invasion and metastasis (among other features). It is caused by the interaction between genetic susceptibility and environmental factors. These factors lead to accumulations of genetic mutations in oncogenes (genes that control the growth rate of cells) and tumor suppressor genes (genes that help to prevent cancer), which gives cancer cells their malignant characteristics, such as uncontrolled growth.

In the broad sense, most chemotherapeutic drugs work by impairing mitosis (cell division), effectively targeting fast-dividing cells. As these drugs cause damage to cells, they are termed cytotoxic. They prevent mitosis by various mechanisms including damaging DNA and inhibition of the cellular machinery involved in cell division. One theory as to why these drugs kill cancer cells is that they induce a programmed form of cell death known as apoptosis.

As chemotherapy affects cell division, tumors with high growth rates (such as acute myelogenous leukemia and the aggressive lymphomas, including Hodgkin's disease) are more sensitive to chemotherapy, as a larger proportion of the targeted cells are undergoing cell division at any time. Malignancies with slower growth rates, such as indolent lymphomas, tend to respond to chemotherapy much more modestly. Heterogeneic tumours may also display varying sensitivities to chemotherapy agents, depending on the subclonal populations within the tumor.

Cells from the immune system also make crucial contributions to the antitumor effects of chemotherapy. For example, the chemotherapeutic drugs oxaliplatin and cyclophosphamide can cause tumor cells to die in a way that is detectable by the immune system (called immunogenic cell death), which mobilizes immune cells with antitumor functions. Chemotherapeutic drugs that cause cancer immunogenic tumor cell death can make unresponsive tumors sensitive to immune checkpoint therapy.

== Other uses ==
Some chemotherapy drugs are used in diseases other than cancer, such as in autoimmune disorders, and noncancerous plasma cell dyscrasia. In some cases they are often used at lower doses, which means that the side effects are minimized, while in other cases doses similar to ones used to treat cancer are used. Methotrexate is used in the treatment of rheumatoid arthritis (RA), psoriasis, ankylosing spondylitis and multiple sclerosis. The anti-inflammatory response seen in RA is thought to be due to increases in adenosine, which causes immunosuppression; effects on immuno-regulatory cyclooxygenase-2 enzyme pathways; reduction in pro-inflammatory cytokines; and anti-proliferative properties. Although methotrexate is used to treat both multiple sclerosis and ankylosing spondylitis, its efficacy in these diseases is still uncertain. Cyclophosphamide is sometimes used to treat lupus nephritis, a common symptom of systemic lupus erythematosus. Dexamethasone along with either bortezomib or melphalan is commonly used as a treatment for AL amyloidosis. Recently, bortezomid in combination with cyclophosphamide and dexamethasone has also shown promise as a treatment for AL amyloidosis. Other drugs used to treat myeloma such as lenalidomide have shown promise in treating AL amyloidosis.

Chemotherapy drugs are also used in conditioning regimens prior to bone marrow transplant (hematopoietic stem cell transplant). Conditioning regimens are used to suppress the recipient's immune system in order to allow a transplant to engraft. Cyclophosphamide is a common cytotoxic drug used in this manner and is often used in conjunction with total body irradiation. Chemotherapeutic drugs may be used at high doses to permanently remove the recipient's bone marrow cells (myeloablative conditioning) or at lower doses that will prevent permanent bone marrow loss (non-myeloablative and reduced intensity conditioning). When used in non-cancer setting, the treatment is still called "chemotherapy", and is often done in the same treatment centers used for people with cancer.

== Outpatient and home care ==
Today, chemotherapy is frequently given in outpatient clinics or taken at home as pills rather than during long hospital stays. It allows patients to recover in a more comfortable environment. Because of how the human body processes these medications, home care introduces unique safety needs. Chemotherapy drugs leave the patient’s system through body fluids like urine, stool, vomit, sweat, and saliva mostly during the first 24 hours to 7 days after treatment. Because these trace toxic chemicals can accidentally expose healthy family members through touch, shared surfaces or as aerosolized droplets during waste disposal, public health groups recommend basic safety habits at home. These typically include washing the patient's laundry separately, double-flushing toilets with the lid down, and having caregivers wear disposable gloves when handling body fluids.

Epidemiological guidelines similarly address residential sexual intimacy and recommend basic safety habits to prevent healthy partners from absorbing the medicine, noting that because teratogenic trace elements are shed via saliva, semen, vaginal secretions and other body fluids, oncologists mandate the temporary use of barrier contraceptives and avoiding deep kissing during the drug-clearance window to prevent healthy partner exposure and avoid potential fetal complications. Consequently, family members are advised to avoid close contact or kissing if they show any signs of illness, such as a cold or cold sore, to keep the patient safe from secondary infections.

== Occupational exposure and safe handling ==
In the 1970s, antineoplastic (chemotherapy) drugs were identified as hazardous, and the American Society of Health-System Pharmacists (ASHP) has since then introduced the concept of hazardous drugs after publishing a recommendation in 1983 regarding handling hazardous drugs. The adaptation of federal regulations came when the U.S. Occupational Safety and Health Administration (OSHA) first released its guidelines in 1986 and then updated them in 1996, 1999, and, most recently, 2006.

The National Institute for Occupational Safety and Health (NIOSH) has been conducting an assessment in the workplace since then regarding these drugs. Occupational exposure to antineoplastic drugs has been linked to multiple health effects, including infertility and possible carcinogenic effects. A few cases have been reported by the NIOSH alert report, such as one in which a female pharmacist was diagnosed with papillary transitional cell carcinoma. Twelve years before the pharmacist was diagnosed with the condition, she had worked for 20 months in a hospital where she was responsible for preparing multiple antineoplastic drugs. The pharmacist did not have any other risk factor for cancer, and therefore, her cancer was attributed to the exposure to the antineoplastic drugs, although a cause-and-effect relationship has not been established in the literature. Another case happened when a malfunction in biosafety cabinetry is believed to have exposed nursing personnel to antineoplastic drugs. Investigations revealed evidence of genotoxic biomarkers two and nine months after that exposure.

=== Routes of exposure ===
Antineoplastic drugs are usually given through intravenous, intramuscular, intrathecal, or subcutaneous administration. In most cases, before the medication is administered to the patient, it needs to be prepared and handled by several workers. Any worker who is involved in handling, preparing, or administering the drugs, or with cleaning objects that have come into contact with antineoplastic drugs, is potentially exposed to hazardous drugs. Health care workers are exposed to drugs in different circumstances, such as when pharmacists and pharmacy technicians prepare and handle antineoplastic drugs and when nurses and physicians administer the drugs to patients. Additionally, those who are responsible for disposing antineoplastic drugs in health care facilities are also at risk of exposure.

Dermal exposure is thought to be the main route of exposure due to the fact that significant amounts of the antineoplastic agents have been found in the gloves worn by healthcare workers who prepare, handle, and administer the agents. Another noteworthy route of exposure is inhalation of the drugs' vapors. Multiple studies have investigated inhalation as a route of exposure, and although air sampling has not shown any dangerous levels, it is still a potential route of exposure. Ingestion by hand to mouth is a route of exposure that is less likely compared to others because of the enforced hygienic standard in the health institutions. However, it is still a potential route, especially in the workplace, outside of a health institute. One can also be exposed to these hazardous drugs through injection by needle sticks. Research conducted in this area has established that occupational exposure occurs by examining evidence in multiple urine samples from health care workers.

=== Hazards ===
Hazardous drugs expose health care workers to serious health risks. Many studies show that antineoplastic drugs could have many side effects on the reproductive system, such as fetal loss, congenital malformation, and infertility. Health care workers who are exposed to antineoplastic drugs on many occasions have adverse reproductive outcomes such as spontaneous abortions, stillbirths, and congenital malformations. Moreover, studies have shown that exposure to these drugs leads to menstrual cycle irregularities. Antineoplastic drugs may also increase the risk of learning disabilities among children of health care workers who are exposed to these hazardous substances.

Moreover, these drugs have carcinogenic effects. In the past five decades, multiple studies have shown the carcinogenic effects of exposure to antineoplastic drugs. Similarly, there have been research studies that linked alkylating agents with humans developing leukemias. Studies have reported elevated risk of breast cancer, nonmelanoma skin cancer, and cancer of the rectum among nurses who are exposed to these drugs. Other investigations revealed that there is a potential genotoxic effect from anti-neoplastic drugs to workers in health care settings.

=== Safe handling in health care settings ===
As of 2018, there were no occupational exposure limits set for antineoplastic drugs, i.e., OSHA or the American Conference of Governmental Industrial Hygienists (ACGIH) have not set workplace safety guidelines.

==== Preparation ====
NIOSH recommends using a ventilated cabinet that is designed to decrease worker exposure. Additionally, it recommends training of all staff, the use of cabinets, implementing an initial evaluation of the technique of the safety program, and wearing protective gloves and gowns when opening drug packaging, handling vials, or labeling. When wearing personal protective equipment, one should inspect gloves for physical defects before use and always wear double gloves and protective gowns. Health care workers are also required to wash their hands with water and soap before and after working with antineoplastic drugs, change gloves every 30 minutes or whenever punctured, and discard them immediately in a chemotherapy waste container.

The gowns used should be disposable gowns made of polyethylene-coated polypropylene. When wearing gowns, individuals should make sure that the gowns are closed and have long sleeves. When preparation is done, the final product should be completely sealed in a plastic bag.

The health care worker should also wipe all waste containers inside the ventilated cabinet before removing them from the cabinet. Finally, workers should remove all protective wear and put them in a bag for their disposal inside the ventilated cabinet.

==== Administration ====
Drugs should only be administered using protective medical devices such as needle lists and closed systems and techniques such as priming of IV tubing by pharmacy personnel inside a ventilated cabinet. Workers should always wear personal protective equipment such as double gloves, goggles, and protective gowns when opening the outer bag and assembling the delivery system to deliver the drug to the patient, and when disposing of all material used in the administration of the drugs.

Hospital workers should never remove tubing from an IV bag that contains an antineoplastic drug, and when disconnecting the tubing in the system, they should make sure the tubing has been thoroughly flushed. After removing the IV bag, the workers should place it together with other disposable items directly in the yellow chemotherapy waste container with the lid closed. Protective equipment should be removed and put into a disposable chemotherapy waste container. After this has been done, one should double bag the chemotherapy waste before or after removing one's inner gloves. Moreover, one must always wash one's hands with soap and water before leaving the drug administration site.

==== Employee training ====
All employees whose jobs in health care facilities expose them to hazardous drugs must receive training. Training should include shipping and receiving personnel, housekeepers, pharmacists, assistants, and all individuals involved in the transportation and storage of antineoplastic drugs. These individuals should receive information and training to inform them of the hazards of the drugs present in their areas of work. They should be informed and trained on operations and procedures in their work areas where they can encounter hazards, different methods used to detect the presence of hazardous drugs and how the hazards are released, and the physical and health hazards of the drugs, including their reproductive and carcinogenic hazard potential. Additionally, they should be informed and trained on the measures they should take to avoid and protect themselves from these hazards. This information ought to be provided when health care workers come into contact with the drugs, that is, perform the initial assignment in a work area with hazardous drugs. Moreover, training should also be provided when new hazards emerge as well as when new drugs, procedures, or equipment are introduced.

==== Housekeeping and waste disposal ====
When performing cleaning and decontaminating the work area where antineoplastic drugs are used, one should make sure that there is sufficient ventilation to prevent the buildup of airborne drug concentrations. When cleaning the work surface, hospital workers should use deactivation and cleaning agents before and after each activity as well as at the end of their shifts. Cleaning should always be done using double protective gloves and disposable gowns. After employees finish up cleaning, they should dispose of the items used in the activity in a yellow chemotherapy waste container while still wearing protective gloves. After removing the gloves, they should thoroughly wash their hands with soap and water. Anything that comes into contact or has a trace of the antineoplastic drugs, such as needles, empty vials, syringes, gowns, and gloves, should be put in the chemotherapy waste container.

==== Spill control ====
A written policy needs to be in place in case of a spill of antineoplastic products. The policy should address the possibility of various sizes of spills as well as the procedure and personal protective equipment required for each size. A trained worker should handle a large spill and always dispose of all cleanup materials in the chemical waste container according to EPA regulations, not in a yellow chemotherapy waste container.

=== Occupational monitoring ===
A medical surveillance program must be established. In case of exposure, occupational health professionals need to ask for a detailed history and do a thorough physical exam. They should test the urine of the potentially exposed worker by doing a urine dipstick or microscopic examination, mainly looking for blood, as several antineoplastic drugs are known to cause bladder damage.

Urinary mutagenicity is a marker of exposure to antineoplastic drugs that was first used by Falck and colleagues in 1979 and uses bacterial mutagenicity assays. Apart from being nonspecific, the test can be influenced by extraneous factors such as dietary intake and smoking and is, therefore, used sparingly. However, the test played a significant role in changing the use of horizontal flow cabinets to vertical flow biological safety cabinets during the preparation of antineoplastic drugs because the former exposed health care workers to high levels of drugs. This changed the handling of drugs and effectively reduced workers' exposure to antineoplastic drugs.

Biomarkers of exposure to antineoplastic drugs commonly include urinary platinum, methotrexate, urinary cyclophosphamide and ifosfamide, and urinary metabolite of 5-fluorouracil. In addition to this, there are other drugs used to measure the drugs directly in the urine, although they are rarely used. A measurement of these drugs directly in one's urine is a sign of high exposure levels and that an uptake of the drugs is happening either through inhalation or dermally.

== Available agents ==
There is an extensive list of antineoplastic agents. Several classification schemes have been used to subdivide the medicines used for cancer into several different types.

== History ==
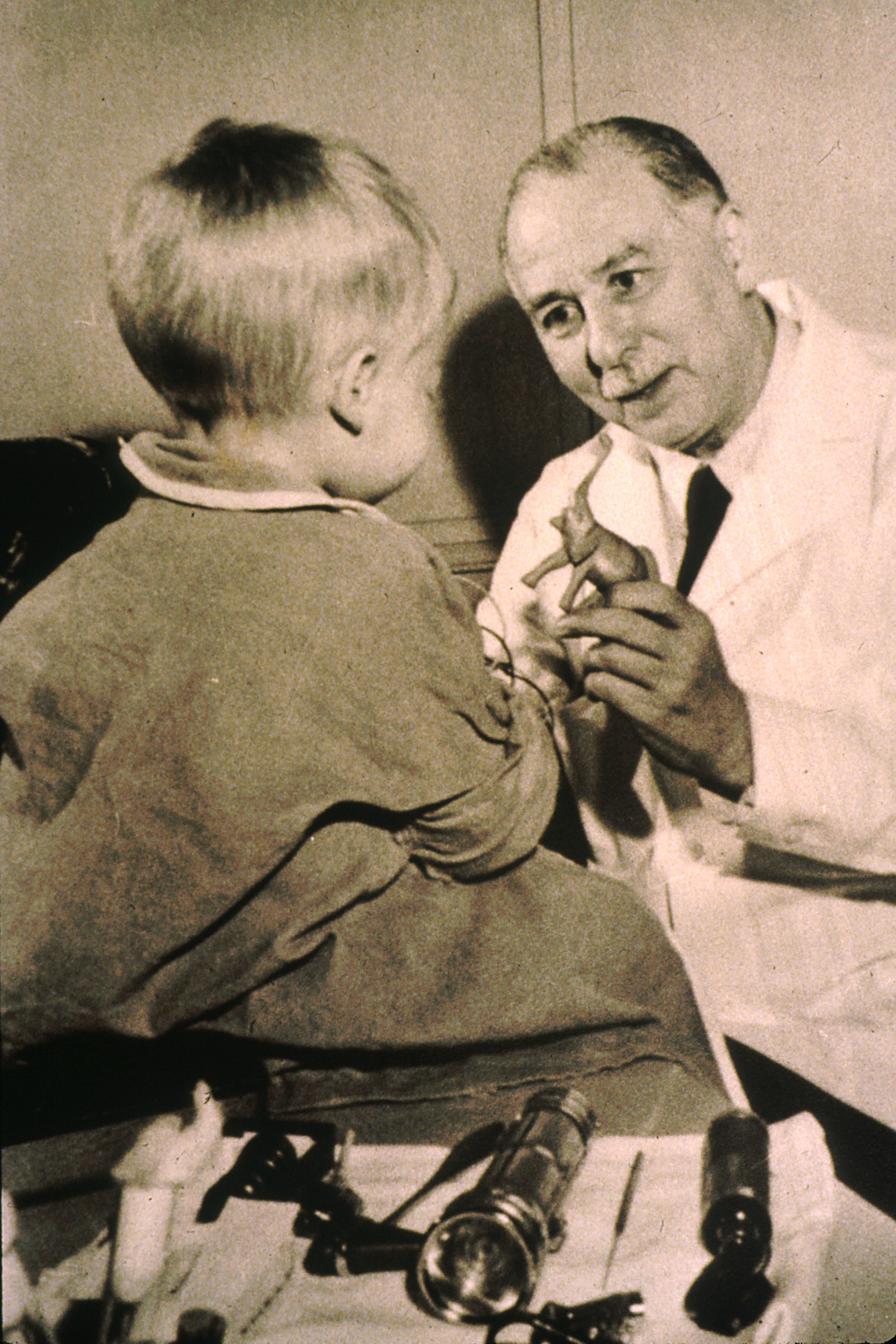
Sidney Farber did pioneering work in chemotherapy.

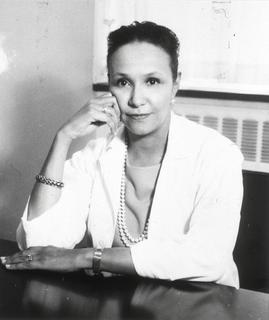
Jane C. Wright pioneered the use of the drug methotrexate to treat breast cancer and skin cancer.

The first use of small-molecule drugs to treat cancer was in the early 20th century, although the specific chemicals first used were not originally intended for that purpose. Mustard gas was used as a chemical warfare agent during World War I and was discovered to be a potent suppressor of hematopoiesis (blood production). A similar family of compounds known as nitrogen mustards were studied further during World War II at the Yale School of Medicine. It was reasoned that an agent that damaged the rapidly growing white blood cells might have a similar effect on cancer. Therefore, in December 1942, several people with advanced lymphomas (cancers of the lymphatic system and lymph nodes) were given the drug by vein, rather than by breathing the irritating gas. Their improvement, although temporary, was remarkable. Concurrently, during a military operation in World War II, following a German air raid on the Italian harbour of Bari, several hundred people were accidentally exposed to mustard gas, which had been transported there by the Allied forces to prepare for possible retaliation in the event of German use of chemical warfare. The survivors were later found to have very low white blood cell counts. After WWII was over and the reports declassified, the experiences converged and led researchers to look for other substances that might have similar effects against cancer. The first chemotherapy drug to be developed from this line of research was mustine. Since then, many other drugs have been developed to treat cancer, and drug development has exploded into a multibillion-dollar industry, although the principles and limitations of chemotherapy discovered by the early researchers still apply.

=== The term chemotherapy ===
The word chemotherapy without a modifier usually refers to cancer treatment, but its historical meaning was broader. The term was coined in the early 1900s by Paul Ehrlich as meaning any use of chemicals to treat any disease (chemo- + -therapy), such as the use of antibiotics (antibacterial chemotherapy). Ehrlich was not optimistic that effective chemotherapy drugs would be found for the treatment of cancer. The first modern chemotherapeutic agent was arsphenamine, an arsenic compound discovered in 1907 and used to treat syphilis. This was later followed by sulfonamides (sulfa drugs) and penicillin. In today's usage, the sense "any treatment of disease with drugs" is often expressed with the word pharmacotherapy.

== Research ==
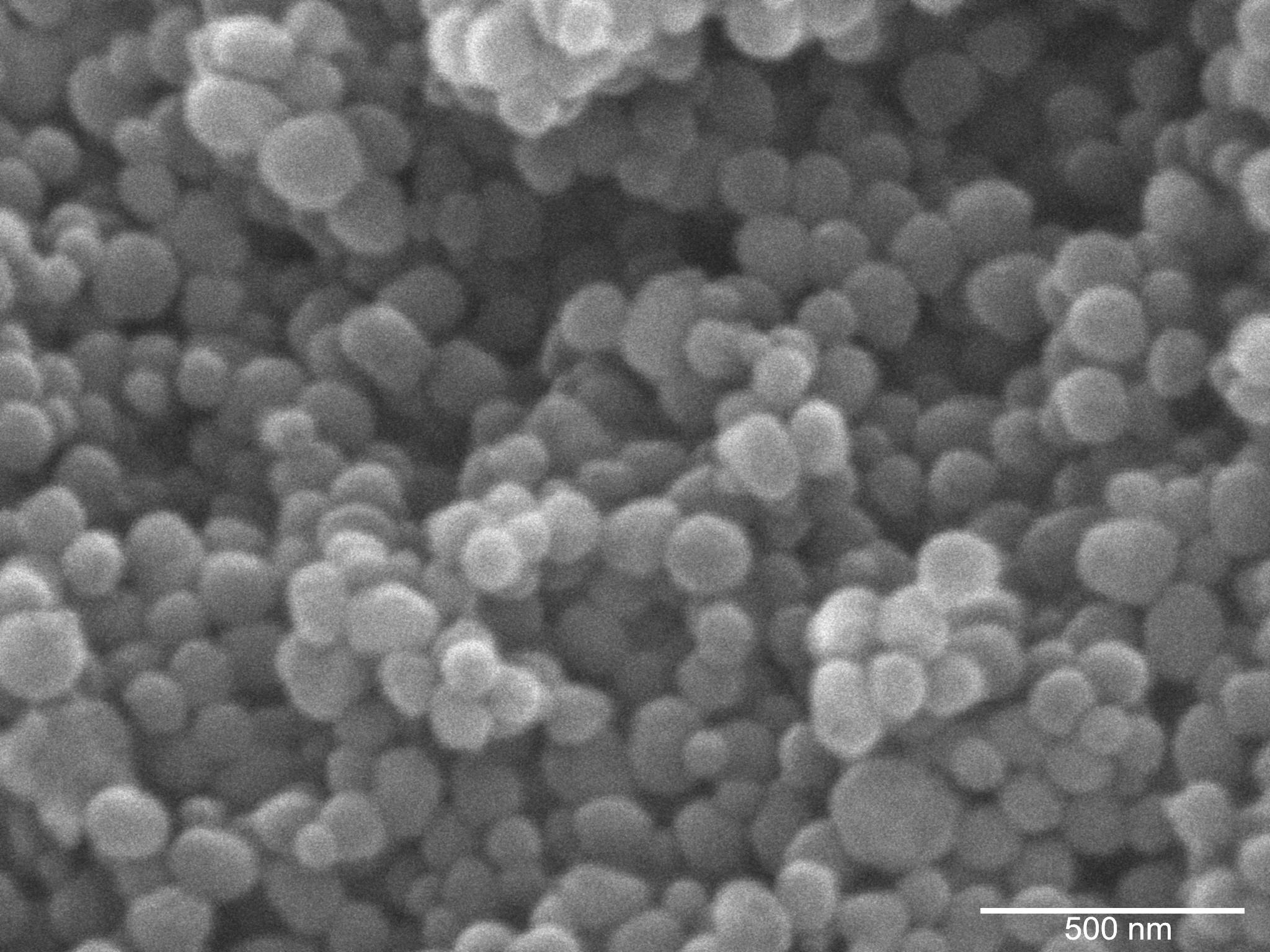
Scanning electron micrograph of mesoporous silica, a type of nanoparticle used in the delivery of chemotherapeutic drugs

=== Targeted delivery vehicles ===
Specially targeted delivery vehicles aim to increase effective levels of chemotherapy for tumor cells while reducing effective levels for other cells. This should result in an increased tumor kill or reduced toxicity or both.

==== Antibody-drug conjugates ====
Antibody-drug conjugates (ADCs) comprise an antibody, drug and a linker between them. The antibody will be targeted at a preferentially expressed protein in the tumour cells (known as a tumor antigen) or on cells that the tumor can utilise, such as blood vessel endothelial cells. They bind to the tumor antigen and are internalised, where the linker releases the drug into the cell. These specially targeted delivery vehicles vary in their stability, selectivity, and choice of target, but, in essence, they all aim to increase the maximum effective dose that can be delivered to the tumor cells. Reduced systemic toxicity means that they can also be used in people who are sicker and that they can carry new chemotherapeutic agents that would have been far too toxic to deliver via traditional systemic approaches.

The first approved drug of this type was gemtuzumab ozogamicin (Mylotarg), released by Wyeth (now Pfizer). The drug was approved to treat acute myeloid leukemia. Two other drugs, trastuzumab emtansine and brentuximab vedotin, are both in late clinical trials, and the latter has been granted accelerated approval for the treatment of refractory Hodgkin's lymphoma and systemic anaplastic large cell lymphoma.

==== Nanoparticles ====
Nanoparticles are 1–1000 nanometer (nm) sized particles that can promote tumor selectivity and aid in delivering low-solubility drugs. Nanoparticles can be targeted passively or actively. Passive targeting exploits the difference between tumor blood vessels and normal blood vessels. Blood vessels in tumors are "leaky" because they have gaps from 200 to 2000 nm, which allow nanoparticles to escape into the tumor. Active targeting uses biological molecules (antibodies, proteins, DNA and receptor ligands) to preferentially target the nanoparticles to the tumor cells. There are many types of nanoparticle delivery systems, such as silica, polymers, liposomes and magnetic particles. Nanoparticles made of magnetic material can also be used to concentrate agents at tumor sites using an externally applied magnetic field. They have emerged as a useful vehicle in magnetic drug delivery for poorly soluble agents such as paclitaxel.

=== Electrochemotherapy ===
Electrochemotherapy is the combined treatment in which injection of a chemotherapeutic drug is followed by application of high-voltage electric pulses locally to the tumor. The treatment enables the chemotherapeutic drugs, which otherwise cannot or hardly go through the membrane of cells (such as bleomycin and cisplatin), to enter the cancer cells. Hence, greater effectiveness of antitumor treatment is achieved.

Clinical electrochemotherapy has been successfully used for treatment of cutaneous and subcutaneous tumors irrespective of their histological origin. The method has been reported as safe, simple and highly effective in all reports on clinical use of electrochemotherapy. According to the ESOPE project (European Standard Operating Procedures of Electrochemotherapy), the Standard Operating Procedures (SOP) for electrochemotherapy were prepared, based on the experience of the leading European cancer centres on electrochemotherapy. Recently, new electrochemotherapy modalities have been developed for treatment of internal tumors using surgical procedures, endoscopic routes or percutaneous approaches to gain access to the treatment area.

=== Hyperthermia therapy ===
Hyperthermia therapy is heat treatment for cancer that can be a powerful tool when used in combination with chemotherapy (thermochemotherapy) or radiation for the control of a variety of cancers. The heat can be applied locally to the tumor site, which will dilate blood vessels to the tumor, allowing more chemotherapeutic medication to enter the tumor. Additionally, the tumor cell membrane will become more porous, further allowing more of the chemotherapeutic medicine to enter the tumor cell.

Hyperthermia has also been shown to help prevent or reverse "chemo-resistance." Chemotherapy resistance sometimes develops over time as the tumors adapt and can overcome the toxicity of the chemo medication. "Overcoming chemoresistance has been extensively studied within the past, especially using CDDP-resistant cells. In regard to the potential benefit that drug-resistant cells can be recruited for effective therapy by combining chemotherapy with hyperthermia, it was important to show that chemoresistance against several anticancer drugs (e.g. mitomycin C, anthracyclines, BCNU, melphalan) including CDDP could be reversed at least partially by the addition of heat.

=== Nutritional adjuncts ===
In the context of managing the adverse effects of chemotherapy, some research has looked at whether omega‑3 supplements might help patients mitigate toxicity and maintain their physical strength. A 2015 review of small studies, alongside more recent 2022 research, found signs that omega‑3s may help patients keep more of their body weight and muscle, support certain aspects of quality of life, and decrease treatment-related toxicity and inflammation. The evidence is still limited and the studies varied, so it is not known how meaningful these effects are. However, reviews note that patients taking omega‑3 supplements alongside conventional therapies do not do worse than those who do not. Similarly, a 2022 meta-analysis and a 2023 systematic review focusing on lung cancer patients undergoing radiotherapy and chemotherapy found that omega-3 supplementation helped improve nutritional status, such as maintaining body weight, and reduced markers of inflammation and treatment toxicity. Additionally, researchers are investigating the molecular mechanisms of omega-3s to see if they might help combat chemoresistance, particularly in breast cancer treatments. Another analysis looking at adults receiving chemotherapy or radiotherapy found that high‑calorie oral nutritional supplements without omega‑3 fats did not help patients maintain their weight, while high‑protein supplements enriched with omega‑3s were linked with better weight maintenance than similar‑calorie products without omega‑3s.

== Use in animals ==
Chemotherapy is used in veterinary medicine similar to how it is used in human medicine.

== See also ==
- Anti-Cancer Drugs (journal)
- Antineoplastic
- Antimicrobial chemotherapy
- Cancer and nausea
- Cancer-related fatigue
- Chemo brain
- Chemotherapy regimens
- Cytostasis
- Experimental cancer treatments
- Safe Handling of Hazardous Drugs
- Drug delivery
- Hyperthermia therapy
- Immunotherapy
- List of chemotherapeutic agents
- National Comprehensive Cancer Network
- Ototoxicity
- Radiation induced cognitive decline
- Radiotherapy
- Virotherapy
- Distress in cancer caregiving
