= George "Doc" Lopez =

Freediver and spearfisherman

George "Doc" Lopez is the founder and former chief executive officer and chairman of the board of ICU Medical, Inc. and a noted freediver and spearfisherman who has held several world and U.S. records in both sports.

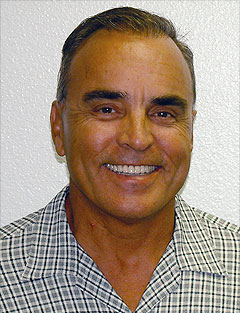
ICU Medical Founder Dr. George "Doc" Lopez.

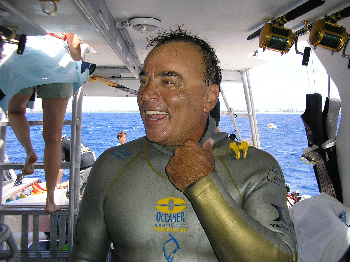
Dr. George ‘Doc’ Lopez after setting US National record for the Free Immersion diving in 2006.

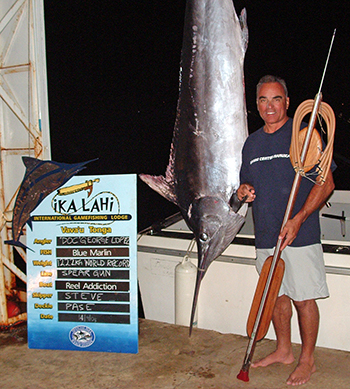
Dr. Lopez poses beside his world record blue marlin in 2004

== ICU Medical, Inc. ==
Lopez received an M.D. from University of Colorado School of Medicine (1973).

As a board certified practicing internist, Dr. Lopez started ICU Medical after he invented a product known as the ClickLock, which provided a locking mechanism for IV systems. The ClickLock consisted of a protected needle and locking housing that prevented reduced needlestick injuries. The ClickLock was the first of several clinical innovations Dr. Lopez developed for ICU Medical that focused on enhancing safety at the point of care, including the Clave family of needlefree vascular access devices and the Neutron Catheter Patency Device.

In 2006, ICU Medical introduced its first products into the oncology marketplace. Dr. Lopez was the lead inventor of the ChemoClave system, a closed system transfer device (CSTD) that allows pharmacists and nurses to safely mix and administer hazardous drugs used to treat cancer patients without exposing themselves to these drugs. Dr. Lopez was inspired to create the company's oncology product line after his wife, Dr. Diana Kostyra Lopez, lost her six-year battle with cancer. In 2012, ICU Medical introduced a new product in her honor, the Diana hazardous drug compounding system for the automated safe handling of oncology drugs.

ICU Medical acquired the former Abbott Laboratories Critical Care business from Hospira in 2009 following a four-year business arrangement in which ICU acted as the manufacturer of the Hospira critical care product line. The acquisition allowed ICU to obtain new manufacturing space in Salt Lake City, Utah, while it also broadened the company's footprint in the hospital marketplace with products designed for use in high acuity clinical settings like the operating room and intensive care unit. In 2012, ICU Medical reported $316.9 million in sales worldwide.

In 2014, Dr. Lopez retired as chief executive officer and chairman of the board of ICU Medical and now serves as a director on the company's board of directors.

== Freediving and spearfishing records ==
As an avid freediver (also known as breath-hold diving) and member of the Performance Freediving Team, Dr. Lopez has held records in Free Immersion and Variable Ballast diving, In addition to his freediving records, Dr. Lopez formerly held the world record for the largest black marlin ever caught spearfishing without scuba gear (269.4 pounds (122.2 kg)).
