= Hospira =

American pharmaceutical company

- Type: Subsidiary
- Traded as: NYSE: HSP
- Founded: May 3, 2004 (spun off from Abbott Laboratories)
- Headquarters: Lake Forest, Illinois, United States
- Key people: F. Michael (Mike) Ball (CEO); John C. Staley, Chairman of the Board of Directors
- Products: Generic acute-care and oncology injectables, integrated infusion therapy, medication management systems
- Revenue: $4.5 billion (2014)
- Number of employees: Approximately 19,000
- Parent: Pfizer
- Website: www.pfizerhospitalus.com

Hospira was an American global pharmaceutical and medical device company with headquarters in Lake Forest, Illinois. It had approximately 19,000 employees. Before its acquisition by Pfizer, Hospira was the world's largest producer of generic injectable pharmaceuticals, manufacturing generic acute-care and oncology injectables, as well as integrated infusion therapy and medication management systems. Hospira's products are used by hospitals and alternate site providers, such as clinics, home healthcare providers and long-term care facilities. It was formerly the hospital products division of Abbott Laboratories. On September 3, 2015, Hospira was acquired by Pfizer, who subsequently sold off the medical devices portion of Hospira to ICU Medical.

Worldwide sales in 2014 were approximately $4.5 billion. Current results are now part of Pfizer's consolidated statements.

== History ==
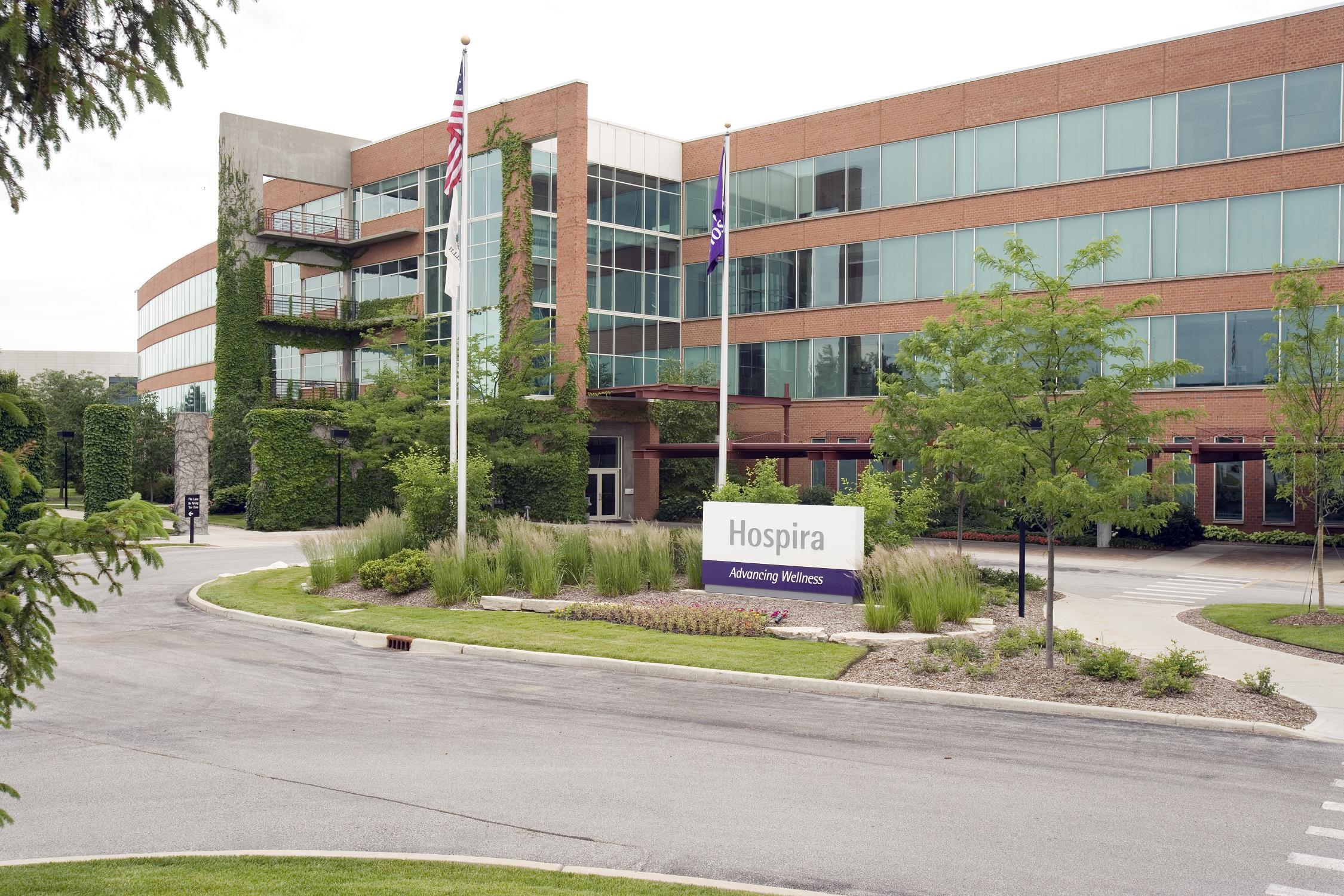
Hospira corporate headquarters in Lake Forest, Illinois

In January 2004, Abbott announced it was spinning off its hospital products division.

Hospira's name was picked by employee vote. The name is derived from the words "hospital," "spirit," "inspire," and spero, a Latin word meaning "hope." Hospira became an independent company on May 3, 2004, with 14,000 employees, 14 manufacturing sites and an estimated $2.5 billion in annual sales.

In 2007, Hospira purchased Mayne Pharma Ltd., an Australian-based specialty injectable pharmaceuticals company, for $2.1 billion.

In 2009, Hospira acquired the biotechnology business from Pliva-Croatia, the generic injectable pharmaceuticals business of Orchid Chemicals & Pharmaceuticals Ltd., a leading Indian pharmaceuticals company, for approximately $400 million, and TheraDoc, a clinical informatics company that develops hospital surveillance systems, in 2009. In 2010, Hospira acquired Javelin Pharmaceuticals, Inc., maker of post-operative pain management drug Dyloject, for approximately $145 million.

In 2011, Hospira's board chose Mike Ball, formerly president of Allergan, as Hospira's new CEO. Ball became CEO in March 2011. Hospira named John Staley its non-executive chairman with the retirement of former executive chairman Christopher Begley in January 2012. Begley had announced his retirement as Hospira's chief executive in August 2010, but had remained as executive chairman.

In 2015, Pfizer signed an agreement to acquire Hospira. The roughly $17 billion acquisition was completed in September, 2015. A year later Pfizer sold the medical devices portion of Hospira to ICU Medical for roughly $900 million in cash, stock, and other consideration.

In 2020 through 2022, Pfizer used Hospira, Inc. as a trade name in reference to the subsidiary's involvement in as a supplier of 0.9% Sodium chloride Injection USP diluent for use with the Pfizer–BioNTech COVID-19 vaccine.

== Sodium thiopental production ==
Sodium thiopental is an anesthetic discovered by Abbott Laboratories in the 1930s. Hospira manufactured the drug after splitting off from Abbott under the brand name Pentothal. The WHO considers it an essential drug. However, it is also used as part of the lethal injection protocol in many US states. Though Hospira has supplied these states with the drug, it has said, "we do not support the use of any of our products in capital punishment procedures."

In January 2011, the company announced that it would stop producing sodium thiopental. Hospira had recently moved production of the drug from a plant in North Carolina to a plant in Liscate, Italy. However, the Italian government would only allow Hospira to manufacture it if they could guarantee it wouldn't be used in capital punishment. The Italian constitution bans the use of capital punishment. Company officials determined there was no way it could prevent sodium thiopental from being used in executions, and did not want to expose their employees to liability.

== Legislation and litigation ==
In August 2009, Hospira introduced a generic version of oxaliplatin, originally developed by Sanofi-Aventis SA for treating colon cancer. In April 2010, Hospira announced a legal settlement with Sanofi-Aventis, under the terms of which Hospira agreed to stop selling oxaliplatin injection in the United States by June 30, 2010, with the stipulation that they could relaunch the product on August 9, 2012.

In 2010, the U.S. Congress passed legislation that would allow the marketing of biosimilar drugs in the United States. The legislation provided for 12 years of data exclusivity for brand-name biologics. Some consumer groups, like AARP, oppose this provision, saying it would cause lack of access to the promise of such drugs.

== Competitors ==
Hospira's competitors in specialty injectable pharmaceuticals include Fresenius AG, Baxter International Inc., Bedford Laboratories, Mylan, Sandoz, Teva Pharmaceuticals as well as divisions of several multinational pharmaceutical companies. Its competitors in medication management systems include Baxter, B. Braun Melsungen AG, CareFusion and Fresenius Medical Care AG.

== Infusion pump system firmware vulnerability disclosures ==
In 2014-2015 two security researchers independently identified what were described as severe defects in Hospira's PCA system firmware, the software controlling various of their drug infusion equipment (CVE-2015-3459 and further advisory ICSA-15-125-01B). Numerous remote exploit vulnerabilities were found, in what was believed to be the first FDA safety advisory of its kind. This was followed in July 2015 by a second FDA recommendation that hospitals discontinue use of the affected pumps entirely. The devices, extent of their flaws, and implications, were widely discussed.
