= George Lopez (record label owner) =

American music executive

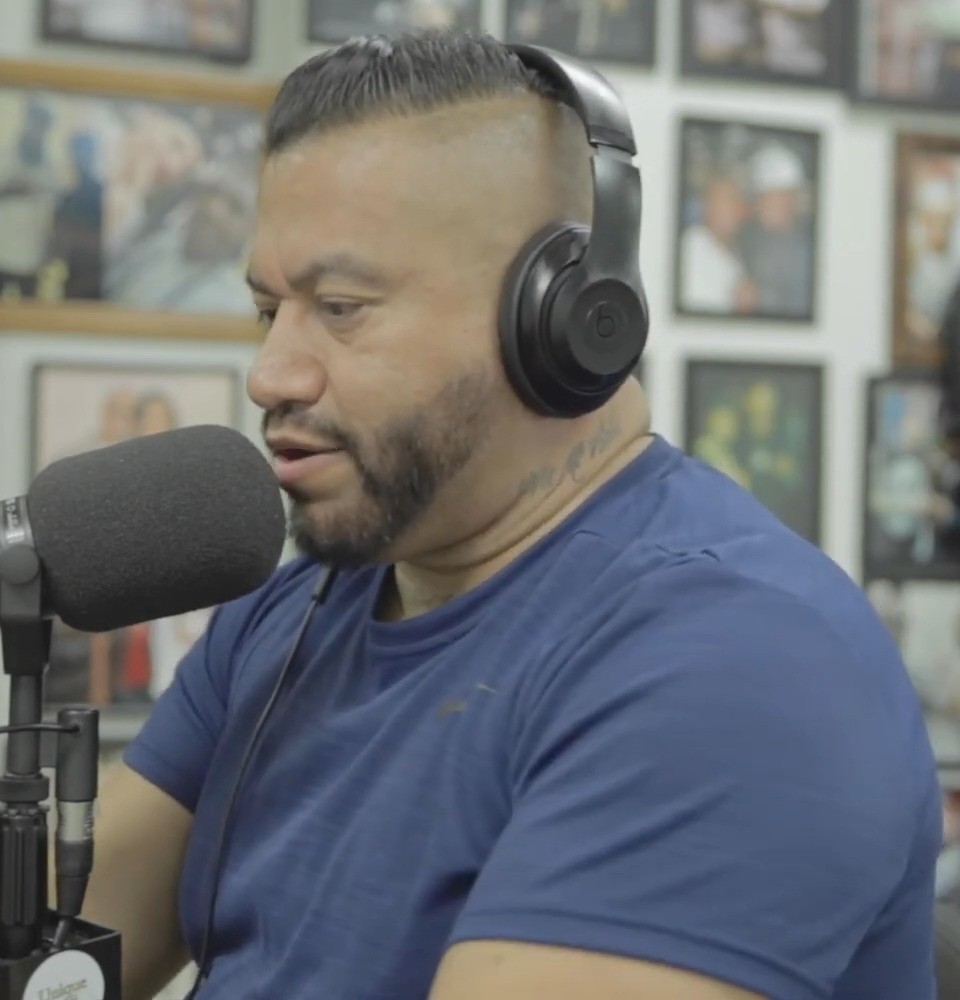
- Lopez in 2021
- Born: Dallas, Texas, U.S.
- Occupations: Music Executive; Entrepreneur; Mogul; Music Manager; A&R
- Known for: Founder of T-Town Music
- Website: georgelopezonline.com

George Lopez is an American music executive, promoter, and proprietor of Texas-based record label and music storefront T-Town Music. He is also the owner and operator of marketing and management entity Jin Music Group, through which he manages Dallas recording artists Big Tuck and Dirty South Rydaz. Originally a DJ, Lopez established a system of independent distribution and marketing with the help of his store that became beneficial to various labels including No Limit Records, Rap-A-Lot Records and Swisha House. The store was also integral to the success of Southern Hip-Hop collective Dirty South Rydaz (DSR), which Lopez and Trini D. formed and managed, consisting of Big Tuck, Tum Tum, Fat Bastard, Lil' Ronnie, Double T, and Addiction. In 2005, Lopez and Trini D. negotiated an agreement that prompted the signing of T-Town Music to Universal Motown Records.

== T-Town Music ==
T-Town Music & More opened its doors for the first time within the Bruton Bazaar complex located in the Pleasant Grove area of Dallas, Texas.

Physically distributed through T-Town Music & More and released via his label that shares a similar name, T-Town Music Ent., George Lopez & Trini D. released mixtapes and albums featuring their artists as well as other artists with which they formed relationships. The high frequency and volume of these releases combined with the release of singles such as local favorite 'Southside Da Realist' by Big Tuck and Tum Tum's "Caprice Musik" (featured on BET's 106 & Park) propelled both the label and the store to nationwide recognition. For years, the location has been included in the marketing and promotional stops for major recording artists. especially neighbors to the Dallas area like Slimthug, Paul Wall, Chamillionaire.
