= Closed system drug transfer device =

A closed system drug transfer device or "CSTD" is a drug transfer device that mechanically prohibits the transfer of environmental contaminants into a system and the escape of hazardous drug or vapor concentrations outside the system. Open versus closed systems are commonly applied in medical devices to maintain the sterility of a fluid pathway. CSTDs work by preventing the uncontrolled inflow and outflow of contaminants and drugs, preserving the quality of solution to be infused into a patient. Theoretically, CSTDs should enable complete protection to healthcare workers in managing hazardous drugs, but possibly due to improper handling or incomplete product design, contaminants can still be detected despite use of CSTDs.

== Medical use ==
Hazardous drugs are often used for patients with cancer. For example, chemotherapy agents are routinely used in the treatment of cancer. However, chemotherapy can be dangerous to a person even if they don't have cancer, as chemotherapy often indiscriminately affects both healthy and cancerous cells. For the healthcare worker tasked with preparing hazardous medications like chemotherapy, manipulation of these agents presents a substantial risk; for example, it may negatively affect their fertility, increase their risk of developing certain cancers themselves, or have unwelcome effects on fetuses. As an addition to standard safe handling practices, CSTDs are devices that are designed to additionally limit exposure of hazardous drugs to the personnel that manipulate them.

== Efficacy ==
Investment and interests in CSTDs continue to grow over the past decade as concerns of Occupational Safety and Health (OSH), together with increased awareness of drug risks have pushed the market to explore better options for handling hazardous materials. A Cochrane review found "no evidence for or against adding CSTD to safe handling of hazardous medicines" based on a review of 23 studies, but acknowledged that the studies did not use randomised controlled trials nor evaluate the value of treatment. CSTDs used in this study include PhaSeal, Tevadaptor and SpikeSwan. It remains that new solutions to increasing safety of handling hazardous drugs have to be developed. Conceptually, through operating in a closed system, CSTDs should significantly reduce risks to nurses. However, the robustness of product design and extent of proper usage by nurses affects the efficacy of the CSTD in achieving OSH.

== History ==
The first FDA-approved CSTD was in 1998, called PhaSeal. Since that time, many other CSTD products have been developed in the United States. MD Anderson hospital was the first hospital in the United States to widely implement CSTD technology.

== Definition ==
The definition of a closed system drug transfer device was first published in an alert warning released by the American National Institute for Occupational Safety and Health (NIOSH). This warning was issued in relation to studies that showed a correlation between working with or near hazardous drugs in a health care environment and the increased risk of developing skin rashes, infertility, miscarriage and infant birth defects, as well as the possibility of developing leukemia and other forms of cancer. This NIOSH alert recommended that a closed system drug transfer device be used whenever hazardous drugs were to be handled.

=== NIOSH ===
NIOSH, in response to the need for a working model as to what a "closed system" and what a "closed system drug transfer device" was, provided the following definition:

"A drug transfer device that mechanically prohibits the transfer of environmental contaminants into the system and the escape of the hazardous drug or vapor concentrations outside the system".

CSTDs generally follow one of two design concepts, using either a physical barrier or an air-cleaning technology to prevent the escape of hazardous drugs into the work environment.

1. Physical barrier - Blocking the unintended release of drug into the surrounding environment or the intake of environment contaminates into a sterile drug pathway.
2. Air cleaning - Prevents the unintended release of drug into the surrounding environment or the intake of environmental contaminates into the sterile drug pathway.

The NIOSH definition is the only definition that includes drug vapors. NIOSH considers the containment of vapor extremely important, such that in September 2015, NIOSH issued a Testing Protocol to assess the effectiveness of closed systems. NIOSH developed and tested five CSTDs to assess its "closeness". Two of the five CSTDs tested passed.

=== Test protocol for closed system transfer devices by NIOSH ===
NIOSH (The National Institute for Occupational Safety and Health, US), recognized the importance of having a universal protocol for evaluating the performance of CSTDs (closed system transfer devices).

CSTD performance means preventing the release of hazardous drugs in the form of vapor, aerosol or droplets. NIOSH issued a draft protocol in September 2016. The protocol listed nine proposed surrogates that are chemically and physically similar to hazardous drug molecules.

- Chemfort, Tevadaptor, PhaSeal and Equashield reduced the quantity of contamination between 5-60 fold. Relative to the needle and syringe, and results were below limit of quantitation.
- The test results for the needle and syringe show the potential risk of drug release and contamination when a CSTD is not used for drug compounding the transfer.
- Chemoclave results are similar to those of needle and syringe, showing a significant level of contamination.

The importance of this universal protocol is that it compares the safety and efficacy of all CSTDs including tasks that challenge different CSTD components in clinical procedures. The 2-POE used as a surrogate in the protocol, tests effectivity the designs of CSTDs and the capacity of each component to prevent drug vapor, aerosol or droplet release.

=== ISOPP ===
ISOPP, the International Society of Oncology Pharmacy Practitioners, splits the definition of a closed system into two different categories:

1. "closed" in terms of microbiological contamination. This definition deals purely with introducing micro-organisms into a sterile product, and there is no consideration of the sterile product coming out of the vial contaminating the environment.
2. "closed" in relation to chemical contamination and refers to drug transfer devices that mechanically prohibit the transfer of environment contaminants into the system and the escape of hazardous drug or vapor concentrations outside the system. ISOPP, however, agree that the NIOSH definition is the most comprehensive and complete.

However, the NIOSH definition is the most comprehensive and complete.

== Products ==
Commercially available CSTD products include the following:

- PhaSeal (BD, US)
- Qimono (Vygon, France)
- Arisure (Yukon Medical, US)
- Tevadaptor (Simplivia Healthcare, Israel)
- Chemfort (Simplivia Healthcare, Israel)
- Halo (Corvida, US)
- ChemoClave (ICU Medical, US)
- ChemoLock (ICU Medical, US)
- Equashield II (Equashield, US)
- NeoShield (JMS, Japan & US)
- ClickLock (Sidam, Italy)
