= Hazardous drug =

In pharmacology, hazardous drugs are drugs that are known to cause harm, which may or may not include genotoxicity (the ability to cause a change or mutation in genetic material). Genotoxicity might involve carcinogenicity, the ability to cause cancer in animal models, humans or both; teratogenicity, which is the ability to cause defects on fetal development or fetal malformation; and lastly hazardous drugs are known to have the potential to cause fertility impairment, which is a major concern for most clinicians. These drugs can be classified as antineoplastics, cytotoxic agents, biological agents, antiviral agents and immunosuppressive agents. This is why safe handling of hazardous drugs is crucial.

== Safe handling ==
Safe handling refers to the process in which health care workers adhere to practices set forth by national health and safety organizations, that have been designed to eliminate or significantly reduce occupational exposure. Some of these practices include but are not limited to, donning of personal protective equipment such as a disposable gown, gloves, masks and the utilization of a closed system drug transfer device. The key to safe handling is to protect the health care worker throughout the three phases of contact with the hazardous drugs. These phases are drug preparation, administration and disposal. Some studies have shown that while compounding hazardous drugs in a Class II biological safety cabinet (BSC) in conjunction with a closed-system drug transfer device, a significant decrease in drug contaminants inside a Class II BSC has resulted. This led the Oncology Nursing Society (ONS) to make the statement in 2003 that a closed-system drug transfer device is viewed as one of safest measures to prevent hazardous drug exposure in a clinician's working environment. However, a Cochrane review published in 2018 that synthesized all available controlled studies found no evidence of a closed-system drug transfer device offering an additional decrease in contamination or exposure to safe handling practices alone.

It has been determined that current personal protective equipment (PPE) does not provide adequate protection against workers handling hazardous drugs—NIOSH states that "... measurable concentrations of some hazardous drugs have been documented in the urine of health care workers who prepared or administered them—even after safety precautions had been employed." Further, NIOSH recommends that institutions should "consider using devices such as closed-system transfer devices. Closed systems limit the potential for generating aerosols and exposing workers". Other guidelines outline that "As other products become available, they should meet the definition of a closed system drug transfer device established by NIOSH and should be required to demonstrate their effectiveness in independent studies".

== See also ==
- USP 800
