= Dural tail sign =

Pattern seen in radiologic examinations

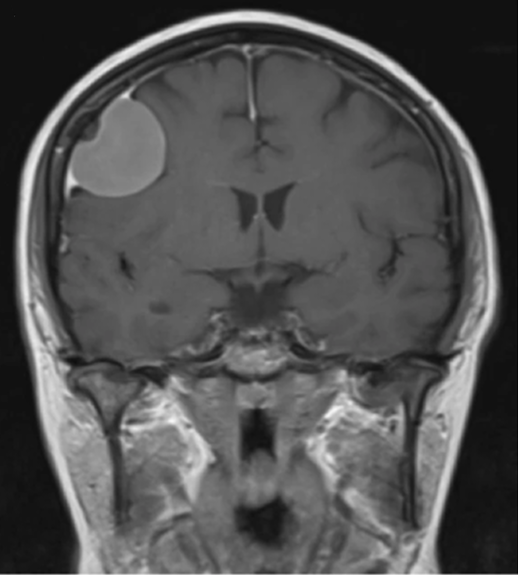
Dural tail sign seen associated with a meningioma

The dural tail sign (also known as dural thickening, the flare sign, or the meningeal sign) is a radiological finding observed in magnetic resonance imaging (MRI) studies of the brain that refers to a thickening of the dura mater immediately adjacent to a mass lesion, such as a brain tumor. Initially, the dural tail sign was thought to be pathognomonic of meningioma, a slow-growing tumor that arises from the meninges. However, subsequent studies have shown that it can also be observed in various intra- and extra-cranial pathologies and in spinal lesions. It is not a completely sensitive finding, as it is seen in only 60-72% of cases. It is not completely specific either, as it has been described associated with lesions like neuromas, chloromas, pituitary diseases, granulomatous disorders, cerebral Erdheim-Chester disease, lymphomas, metastasis, hemangiopericytomas, schwannomas, and gliomas such as glioblastoma multiforme (GBM). The final diagnosis should be further established through cerebrospinal fluid analysis or histopathological examination following a biopsy.

The dural tail sign was first described in 1989 by Wilms et al.. Histopathological correlation from different studies has at times revealed tumor infiltration into the dura mater, however, in most instances, it signifies a hypervascular, non-neoplastic response.

One study showed that including the dural tail in the stereotactic radiosurgery (SRS) or fractionated stereotactic radiotherapy (FSRT) volumes for meningioma treatment did not seem to impact recurrence.
