= Adegramotide =

Experimental cancer drug

Legal status
- Legal status: experimental

Identifiers
- IUPAC name: L-tryptophyl-L-alanyl-L-prolyl-L-valyl-L-leucyl-L-alpha-aspartyl-L-phenylalanyl-L-alanyl-L-prolyl-L-prolyl-glycyl-L-alanyl-L-seryl-L-alanyl-L-tyrosyl-glycyl-L-seryl-L-leucine
- CAS Number: 1252802-98-4
- PubChem CID: 121488164
- ChemSpider: 59651405
- UNII: 4XQ7W02EQ0
- KEGG: D11057
- CompTox Dashboard (EPA): DTXSID701337273

Chemical and physical data
- Formula: C_{87}H_{123}N_{19}O_{24}
- Molar mass: 1819.050 g·mol^{−1}
- 3D model (JSmol): Interactive image
- SMILES: C[C@@H](C(=O)N[C@@H](CO)C(=O)N[C@@H](C)C(=O)N[C@@H](CC1=CC=C(C=C1)O)C(=O)NCC(=O)N[C@@H](CO)C(=O)N[C@@H](CC(C)C)C(=O)O)NC(=O)CNC(=O)[C@@H]2CCCN2C(=O)[C@@H]3CCCN3C(=O)[C@H](C)NC(=O)[C@H](CC4=CC=CC=C4)NC(=O)[C@H](CC(=O)O)NC(=O)[C@H](CC(C)C)NC(=O)[C@H](C(C)C)NC(=O)[C@@H]5CCCN5C(=O)[C@H](C)NC(=O)[C@H](CC6=CNC7=CC=CC=C76)N
- InChI: InChI=InChI=1S/C87H123N19O24/c1-44(2)33-58(100-83(125)71(46(5)6)103-82(124)66-24-17-30-104(66)84(126)49(9)94-74(116)56(88)37-53-39-89-57-22-15-14-21-55(53)57)77(119)99-61(38-70(112)113)78(120)98-60(35-51-19-12-11-13-20-51)76(118)95-50(10)85(127)106-32-18-25-67(106)86(128)105-31-16-23-65(105)81(123)91-40-68(110)92-47(7)72(114)102-64(43-108)79(121)93-48(8)73(115)97-59(36-52-26-28-54(109)29-27-52)75(117)90-41-69(111)96-63(42-107)80(122)101-62(87(129)130)34-45(3)4/h11-15,19-22,26-29,39,44-50,56,58-67,71,89,107-109H,16-18,23-25,30-38,40-43,88H2,1-10H3,(H,90,117)(H,91,123)(H,92,110)(H,93,121)(H,94,116)(H,95,118)(H,96,111)(H,97,115)(H,98,120)(H,99,119)(H,100,125)(H,101,122)(H,102,114)(H,103,124)(H,112,113)(H,129,130)/t47-,48-,49-,50-,56-,58-,59-,60-,61-,62-,63-,64-,65-,66-,67-,71-/m0/s1; Key:QMUKFZMAYHSADK-MZDDNWLQSA-N

Adegramotide (DSP-7888) is an experimental drug intended for treatment of various hematologic malignancies and solid tumors, including glioblastoma multiforme. It is a peptide vaccine and has finished phase I clinical trials and phase II clinical trials.

As of 14 December 2021, phase III clinical research has been cancelled due to low efficacy markers during interim review of study data for Ombipepimut-S Emulsion (DSP-7888) in combination with Bevacizumab.

The phase III trials for DSP-7888 with checkpoint inhibitors for platinum-resistant ovarian cancer, as of 13 August 2024, is still continuing as planned.
