= Glioblastoma Foundation =

Foundation dedicated to glioblastoma

- Formation: June 2016
- Purpose: Glioblastoma Research
- Headquarters: Durham, NC U.S.
- Method: Funding research, Supporting Patients and Caregivers, Spreading Awareness
- Key people: Gita Kwatra
- Website: glioblastomafoundation.org

The Glioblastoma Foundation (GF) is a United States non-profit charitable organization established in June 2016 in Durham, North Carolina by Dr. Madan Kwatra. Operating as a 501(c)(3) organization, the Glioblastoma Foundation focuses on research, providing support, and promoting awareness for glioblastoma, a highly aggressive form of brain cancer.

In February of 2023, Morgan Myles, country music artist and finalist on NBC's Season 22 of The Voice, was announced as the Glioblastoma Foundation's celebrity ambassador. Myles has actively participated in digital campaigns organized by the foundation, aimed at raising awareness about glioblastoma and garnering funding for the cause.

== Research Funding ==
The Glioblastoma Foundation funds research on discovering new and more effective treatments for glioblastoma patients. Grants are allocated to clinicians and scientists affiliated with institutions including Johns Hopkins Hospital, MD Anderson Cancer Center, and Columbia University.

The Glioblastoma Foundation is also involved in supporting the development of a generic version of the chemotherapy drug Lomustine, which has exhibited potential in enhancing survival rates for patients dealing with recurrent glioblastoma. The initiative aims to increase the affordability and accessibility of this drug for a wider range of glioblastoma patients.

In remembrance of Neil Peart, the late drummer of Rush, who succumbed to glioblastoma on January 9, 2020, the Glioblastoma Foundation established the Neil Peart Neurosurgery Resident Research Award in May 2020.

IN 2024, The Glioblastoma Foundation opened a Genomic Testing and Research Laboratory with hopes to improve diagnostic accuracy.

== Patient Support ==
The Glioblastoma Foundation extends support to glioblastoma patients and their families through initiatives including The Glioblastoma Support Circle, a support group for patients and caregivers which is facilitated by clinicians. The Glioblastoma Foundation also assists patients in participating in relevant clinical trials. The organization also has a podcast hosted by WRAL-TV reporter Amanda Lamb that reflects on patient and caregiver stories.
