= Infantile hemangiopericytoma =

- Other names: Congenital hemangiopericytoma
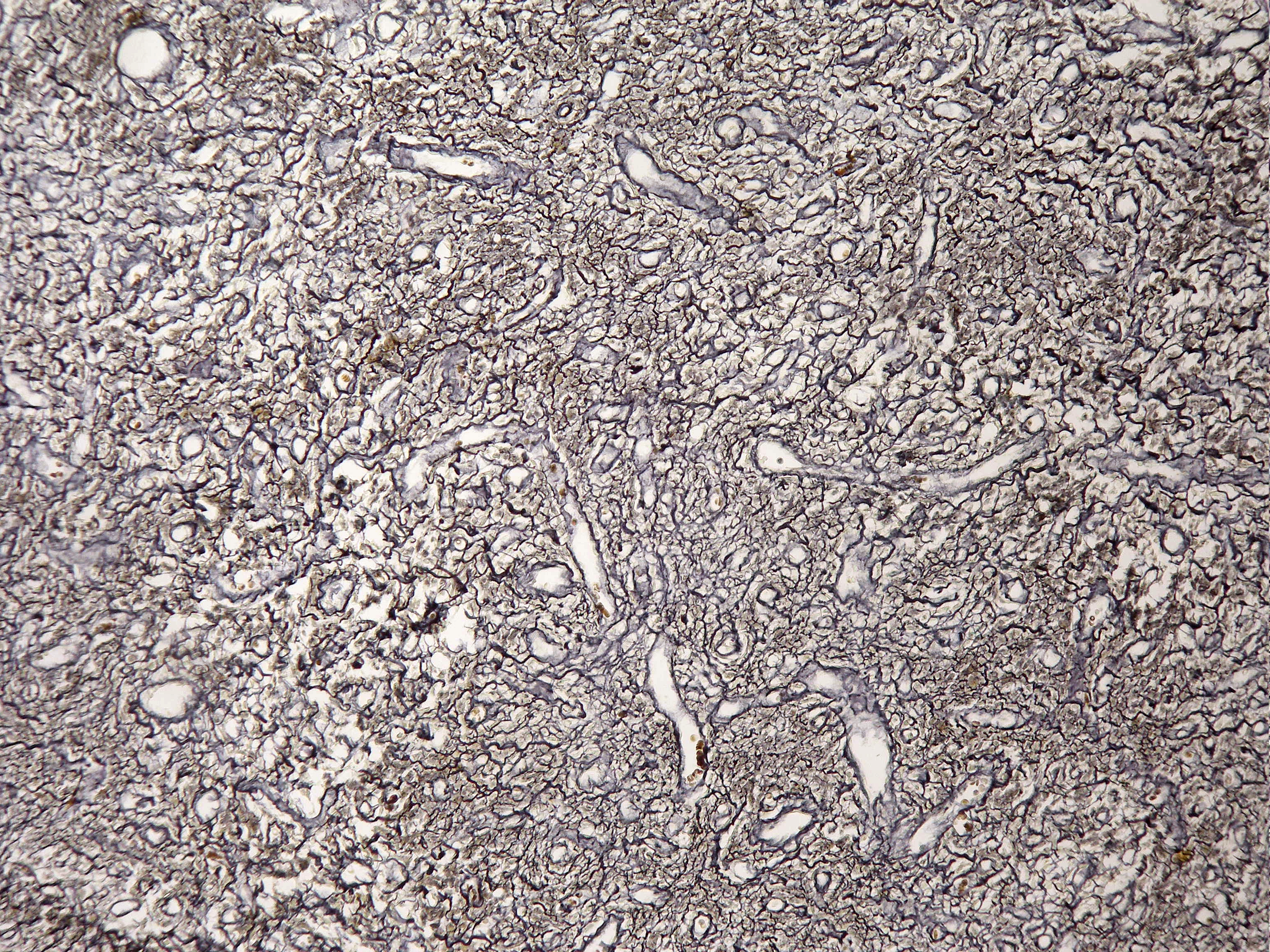
- Haemangiopericytoma
- Specialty: Dermatology

Infantile hemangiopericytoma is a cutaneous condition characterized by single or multiple dermal and subcutaneous nodules that may be alarmingly large at birth or grow rapidly.

== Signs and symptoms ==
Like juvenile hemangiomas, infantile hemangiopericytomas only appear in the subcutis and affect newborns throughout their first year of life. They are characterized by being multilobulated and frequently having separate perivascular and intravascular satellite nodules outside of the main tumor mass. Although there have been reports of numerous lesions, the majority of lesions are solitary. The lower extremities, particularly the thigh, pelvic fossa, and retroperitoneum, are where tumors are most frequently found. Less frequently, it affects the upper extremities and trunk. Most are located in muscular tissue and are deep entrenched. There are reports of lesions in the tongue and sublingual area that are present from birth.

== Diagnosis ==
Histology must be used to make the diagnosis because the tumor may be hard to differentiate from other neoplasms with similar characteristics. Histologically, hemangiopericytoma is characterized by staghorn-shaped blood vessels and sponge-like sinusoidal vasculature that are randomly linked and encircled by ovoid, short spindle-shaped cells. CD34 positive has a high immunohistochemical correlation with hemangiopericytoma.

Other pediatric tumors such tufted angioma, pyogenic granuloma, infantile hemangioma, kaposiform hemangioendothelioma, and angiosarcoma should be taken into consideration in the differential diagnosis.

== Treatment ==
Conservative surgery is the best course of action. The preferred method is wide local excision. Chemotherapy is thought to be the next line of treatment for lesions that cannot be removed. When chemotherapy and surgery fail, radiotherapy should be the last resort.

== See also ==
- Hemangiopericytoma
- List of cutaneous conditions
