= Asunercept =

Legal status
- Legal status: Investigational

Identifiers
- CAS Number: 1450882-18-4
- DrugBank: DB15160
- UNII: F333OQQ9UV

Asunercept (INN; development codes APG101 and CAN008) is a soluble CD95-Fc fusion protein which is in clinical development for the treatment of glioblastoma multiforme (GBM) and myelodysplastic syndromes (MDS). Asunercept has been granted orphan drug status for the treatment of GBM and MDS in the EU and the US. It has also received PRIME designation by the European Medicines Agency (EMA) for the treatment of GBM.

== Mechanism of action ==
Asunercept blocks the CD95–ligand (CD95L) from binding to the CD95-receptor (CD95), which induces apoptosis. In oncology, this blockade is intended to prevent the killing of activated T cells that can be induced by tumor-associated macrophages (TAMs), endothelial cells, or fibroblasts.

In MDS, CD95L-signaling is a negative regulator of erythrocyte production in the bone marrow and its blockade has been shown to rescue erythroid progenitors.

== Clinical development ==
A randomized, double-blind, placebo-controlled phase I study to examine the safety and tolerability of asunercept has shown that it is well tolerated. The efficacy of asunercept was tested in a phase II randomized controlled trial for patients with GBM. A total of 83 patients with first or second relapse of GBM were enrolled in the successful proof-of-concept trial. The primary goal of doubling the number of patients reaching progression-free survival at six months (PFS6) was substantially exceeded.

Asunercept has also been successfully tested in a phase I trial to treat patients with MDS. MDS is a disease in which the bone marrow does not make enough healthy blood cells, which leads to blood cytopenias, especially anemia.
