= Hemangiopericytoma =

Cancer originating from walls of capillaries (pericytes)

- Other names: HPC
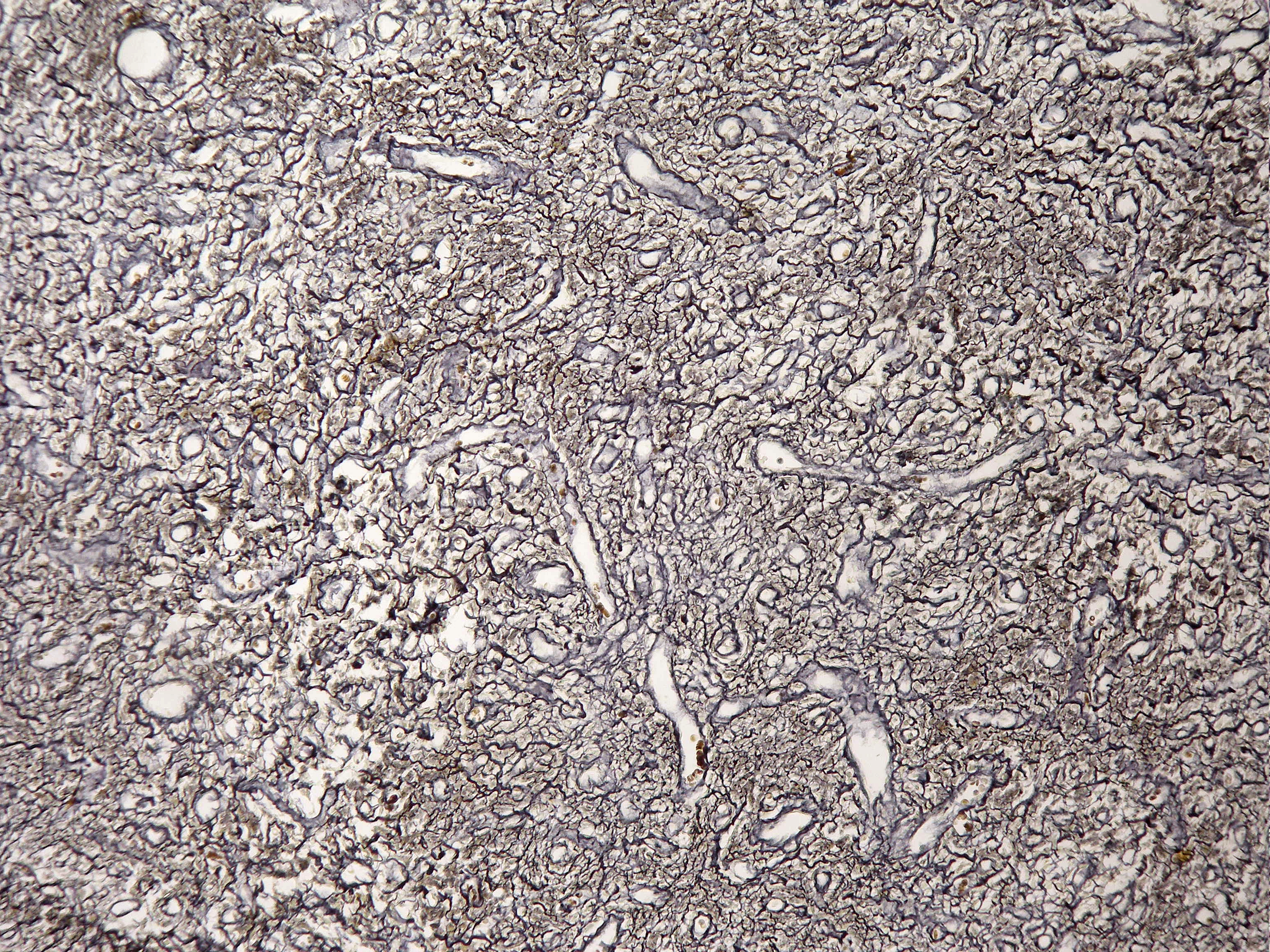
- Haemangiopericytoma, Gomori methenamine silver stain
- Specialty: Neuro-oncology
- Symptoms: Painless mass
- Usual onset: 45 years of age (median)

A hemangiopericytoma is a type of soft-tissue sarcoma that originates in the pericytes in the walls of capillaries. When inside the nervous system, although not strictly a meningioma tumor, it is a meningeal tumor with a special aggressive behavior. It was first characterized in 1942.

== Signs and symptoms ==
Symptoms of hemangiopericytoma vary greatly depending on both tumor stage and affected organs. Most patients report pain and mass-related symptoms, while others also report vascular disease-related symptoms, and some have no symptoms until late in the disease process. Hemangiopericytomas are most commonly found in the meninges, lower extremities, retroperitoneum, pelvis, lungs, and pleura.

== Histopathology ==
Hemangiopericytomas are tumors that are derived from specialized spindle shaped cells called pericytes, which line capillaries.

Hemangiopericytoma is an aggressive mesenchymally derived tumor with oval nuclei with scant cytoplasm. There is dense intercellular reticulin staining. Tumor cells can be fibroblastic, myxoid, or pericytic. These tumors, in contrast to meningiomas, do not stain with epithelial membrane antigen. They have a grade 2 or 3 biological behavior, and need to be distinguished from benign meningiomas because of their high rate of recurrence (68.2%) and metastases.

— W. Sherman and J. Raizer, "Meningiomas", MedMerits (2011), E.J. Dropcho (ed.)

== Distinguishing from meningiomas through molecular genetics ==
Data has shown that there has been some possible leads to treatment targets based on genes. The ALDH1 gene has shown to be over-expressed in hemangiopericytomas more than meningiomas and synovial sarcomas. This will help doctors accurately distinguish hemangiopericytoma from other similar tumors. This gene could also be a treatment target for future cases.

There has also been further data collected regarding genes that distinguish meningiomas from hemangiopericytomas. These two forms of tumors are very similar under a microscope. To combat this issue, scientists decided to the study the NF2 gene using polymorphism analysis and DNA sequencing. This revealed that damage to the NF2 gene was only apparent in some cases with meningiomas. This discovery helped support the difference between meningiomas and hemangiopericytomas and has helped with potential treatment plans.

A study on hemangiopericytoma tumor samples confirmed both the findings above through looking at the overall genetics' changes between the two. Meningiomas have a typical genetic patterns, that were not seen in the hemangiopericytoma samples. Additionally, there was an observed loss of genes on certain chromosomes which is not seen in meningiomas. Overall, these findings confirm that these two tumor-entities are not the same.

== Diagnosis ==
Computerized tomography and magnetic resonance imaging are not effective methods for diagnosis of hemangiocytomas. In practice, a presumptive diagnosis is often reached through exclusion of other soft tissue tumors, and a tissue biopsy is required to confirm diagnosis.

== Treatment ==
Depending on the grade of the sarcoma, it is treated with surgery, chemotherapy, and/or radiotherapy. Though surgery is the current standard of care for hemangiopericytomas, metastasis and tumor recurrence occur in more than 30% of patients, in particular recurrence in the pelvis and retroperitoneum and metastasis in bone and lungs. Radiotherapy does not appear to provide a significant survival benefit but is recommended for use in patients with tumors greater than 5 cm in diameter or with inadequate resection margins after surgery. Clinical benefits of chemotherapy in soft tissue tumors remains unclear. However, the combination of surgery and chemotherapy appears to worsen survival in hemangiopericytoma patients.

More research is needed to determine efficacy of different types of treatment.

== Epidemiology ==
In one series, the median age of affected individuals was 45 years, with a 10-year survival rate of 70 percent. In another study, age over 45 and female sex were associated with worse survival rates in hemangiopericytomas.

== See also ==
- Infantile hemangiopericytoma
- List of cutaneous conditions
