= Cell-cycle nonspecific antineoplastic agents =

Class of pharmaceuticals

Cell-cycle nonspecific antineoplastic agents (CCNS) refer to a class of pharmaceuticals that act as antitumor agents at all or any phases of the cell cycle.

Alkylating antineoplastic agent and anthracyclins are two examples.
