= Alkylating antineoplastic agent =

Pharmaceutical drugs

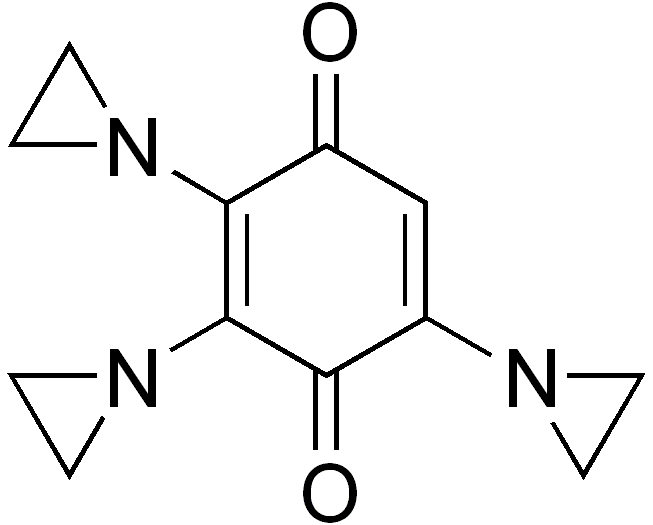
Triaziquone, an alkylating agent used in chemotherapy

An alkylating antineoplastic agent is an alkylating agent used in cancer treatment that attaches to DNA via an alkyl group.

Since cancer cells, in general, proliferate faster and with less error-correcting than healthy cells, cancer cells are more sensitive to DNA damage—such as being alkylated. Alkylating agents are used to treat several cancers. However, they are also toxic to normal cells (cytotoxic), particularly cells that divide frequently, such as those in the gastrointestinal tract, bone marrow, testicles and ovaries, which can cause loss of fertility. Most of the alkylating agents are also carcinogenic.

== History ==
Before their use in chemotherapy, alkylating agents were better known for their use as sulfur mustard, ("mustard gas") and related chemical weapons in World War I. The nitrogen mustards were the first alkylating agents used medically, as well as the first modern cancer chemotherapies. Goodman, Gilman, and others began studying nitrogen mustards at Yale in 1942, and, following the sometimes dramatic but highly variable responses of experimental tumors in mice to treatment, these agents were first tested in humans late that year. Use of methyl-bis (beta-chloroethyl) amine hydrochloride (mechlorethamine, mustine) and tris (beta-chloroethyl) amine hydrochloride for Hodgkin's disease lymphosarcoma, leukemia, and other malignancies resulted in striking but temporary dissolution of tumor masses. Because of secrecy surrounding the war gas program, these results were not published until 1946. These publications spurred rapid advancement in the previously non-existent field of cancer chemotherapy, and a wealth of new alkylating agents with therapeutic effect were discovered over the following two decades.

A common myth holds that Goodman and Gilman were prompted to study nitrogen mustards as a potential treatment for cancer following a 1943 incident in Bari, Italy, where survivors exposed to mustard gas became leukopenic. In fact, animal and human trials had begun the previous year, Gilman makes no mention of such an episode in his recounting of the early trials of nitrogen mustards, and the marrow-suppressing effects of mustard gas had been known since the close of World War I.

== Agents acting nonspecifically ==
Some alkylating agents are active under conditions present in cells; and the same mechanism that makes them toxic allows them to be used as anti-cancer drugs. They stop tumor growth by crosslinking guanine nucleobases in DNA double-helix strands, directly attacking DNA. This makes the strands unable to uncoil and separate. As this is necessary in DNA replication, the cells can no longer divide. These drugs act nonspecifically. Electrophilic alkylating agents such as nitrogen mustards, methanesulfonates, and cisplatins tend to act in this manner to produce a variety of DNA damage products such as mono- and dialkylation, inter- and intrastrand crosslinks, and DNA-protein crosslinks.

== Agents requiring activation ==
Some of the substances require conversion into active substances in vivo (e.g., cyclophosphamide).

Cyclophosphamide is one of the most potent immunosuppressive substances. In small dosages, it is very efficient in the therapy of systemic lupus erythematosus, autoimmune hemolytic anemia, granulomatosis with polyangiitis, and other autoimmune diseases. High dosages cause pancytopenia and hemorrhagic cystitis.

== Dialkylating agents, limpet attachment, and monoalkylating agents ==
Dialkylating agents can react with two different 7-N-guanine residues, and, if these are in different strands of DNA, the result is cross-linkage of the DNA strands, which prevents uncoiling of the DNA double helix. If the two guanine residues are in the same strand, the result is called limpet attachment of the drug molecule to the DNA. Busulfan is an example of a dialkylating agent: it is the methanesulfonate diester of 1,4-butanediol. Methanesulfonate can be eliminated as a leaving group. Both ends of the molecule can be attacked by DNA bases, producing a butylene crosslink between two different bases.

Monoalkylating agents can react only with one 7-N of guanine.

Limpet attachment and monoalkylation do not prevent the separation of the two DNA strands of the double helix but do prevent vital DNA-processing enzymes from accessing the DNA. The final result is inhibition of cell growth or stimulation of apoptosis, cell suicide.

== Examples ==
In the Anatomical Therapeutic Chemical Classification System, alkylating agents are classified under L01A.

=== Classical alkylating agents ===
Many of the agents are known as "classical alkylating agents". These include true alkyl groups, and have been known for a longer time than some of the other alkylating agents. Examples include melphalan and chlorambucil.

The following three groups are almost always considered "classical".

- Nitrogen mustards
  - Cyclophosphamide — the most widely used alkylating agent of modern times
  - Chlormethine also known as mechlorethamine or mustine (HN2) — the first alkylating agent to receive regulatory approval
  - Uramustine or uracil mustard
  - Melphalan
  - Chlorambucil
  - Ifosfamide
  - Bendamustine
- Nitrosoureas
  - Carmustine
  - Lomustine
  - Streptozocin
- Alkyl sulfonates
  - Busulfan

=== Alkylating-like ===
Platinum-based chemotherapeutic drugs (termed platinum analogues) act in a similar manner. These agents do not have an alkyl group, but nevertheless damage DNA. They permanently coordinate to DNA to interfere with DNA repair, so they are sometimes described as "alkylating-like".

- Platinum
  - Cisplatin
  - Carboplatin
  - Dicycloplatin
  - Eptaplatin
  - Lobaplatin
  - Miriplatin
  - Nedaplatin
  - Oxaliplatin
  - Picoplatin
  - Satraplatin
  - Triplatin tetranitrate

These agents also bind at N7 of guanine.

=== Nonclassical ===
Certain alkylating agents are sometimes described as "nonclassical". There is not a perfect consensus on which items are included in this category, but, in general, they include:

- Procarbazine
- Altretamine
- Some sources explicitly exclude the triazenes (dacarbazine, mitozolomide, temozolomide) from the nonclassical category. However, other sources list dacarbazine as nonclassical, and some include temozolomide.
- The platinum agents are also sometimes described as nonclassical.

== Limitations ==
Alkylating antineoplastic agents have limitations. Their functionality has been found to be limited when in the presence of the DNA-repair enzyme O^{6}-methylguanine-DNA methyltransferase (MGMT). Cross-linking of double-stranded DNA by alkylating agents is inhibited by the cellular DNA-repair mechanism, MGMT. If the MGMT promoter region is methylated, the cells no longer produce MGMT, and are therefore more responsive to alkylating agents. Methylation of the MGMT promoter in gliomas is a useful predictor of the responsiveness of tumors to alkylating agents.

== See also ==
- List of hormonal cytostatic antineoplastic agents
