= DCP =

DCP may refer to:

== Medicine ==
- Des-gamma carboxyprothrombin, a liver cancer marker
- Dicycloplatin, a chemotherapy medication
- Diphenylcyclopropenone, a medication for alopecia areata
- Donor conceived person, a person conceived via the donation of sperm or ova, or both
- Dynamic compression plate, a metallic plate used in orthopedics

== Police ==
- Deputy Commissioner of Police, a post in the police commissionerate in india.

== Chemistry ==
- 1,3-Dichloropropene, an organochlorine pesticide
- Angiotensin-converting enzyme, an enzyme
- Dicalcium phosphate, a misnomer for dibasic calcium phosphate (CaHPO_{4})
- Dichlorophenol, several chemical compounds which are derivatives of phenol

== Computing ==
- Dedicated charging port, a USB port type for charging which does not have data signals
- Digital Cinema Package, a distribution package
- DNG Camera Profiles, files defining how a raw image is rendered by image processing software
- Discovery and Configuration Protocol, a protocol within the PROFINET standard
- Disk Control Program, an MS-DOS derivative by East-German VEB Robotron

== Other uses ==
- Data collection platform, an installation of meteorological instruments used in weather forecasting
- David Carrier Porcheron, a Canadian snowboarder
- Democracy for the Citizens Party, a Kenyan political party
- Democratic Center Party, any of several parties
- Deputy Commissioner of Police (disambiguation), a senior rank in many police forces
- Detroit Collegiate Preparatory Academy at Northwestern, now Northwestern High School, Michigan, US
- Deutscher Computerspielpreis, an annual video game awards ceremony
- Dick Clark Productions, American television production company
- Disney College Program, a US national internship program
- Disney Consumer Products, a subsidiary of Disney Parks, Experiences and Products segment of the Walt Disney Company
- Dodge City Productions, a British music group
- Drive, Chip and Putt, a youth golf skills competition at Augusta National Golf Club

== See also ==
- Disease Control Priorities Project (DCPP)
