= Platinum-based antineoplastic =

Chemotherapeutic agents used to treat cancer

Platinum-based antineoplastic drugs (informally called platins) are chemotherapeutic agents used to treat cancer. Their active moieties are coordination complexes of platinum. These drugs are used to treat almost half of people receiving chemotherapy for cancer. In this form of chemotherapy, commonly used drugs include cisplatin, oxaliplatin, and carboplatin, but several have been proposed or are under development. Addition of platinum-based chemotherapy drugs to chemoradiation in women with early cervical cancer seems to improve survival and reduce risk of recurrence.

In total, these drugs can cause a combination of more than 40 specific side effects which include neurotoxicity, which is manifested by peripheral neuropathies including polyneuropathy.

== Mechanism of action ==
As studied mainly on cisplatin, but presumably for other members as well, platinum-based antineoplastic agents cause crosslinking of DNA as monoadduct, interstrand crosslinks, intrastrand crosslinks or DNA protein crosslinks. Mostly they act on the adjacent N-7 position of guanine, forming a 1, 2 intrastrand crosslink. The resultant crosslinking inhibits DNA repair and/or DNA synthesis. This mechanism leads to specific patterns of damage in DNA, which can kill cancer cells but can also increase the risk of secondary tumors developing. Platinum(IV) prodrugs have also been investigated as a strategy to overcome resistance to platinum chemotherapy. In preclinical models of prostate cancer, the cisplatin prodrug Platin-L inhibited fatty acid oxidation through interaction with CPT1A and showed activity against cisplatin-resistant tumors.

Platinum-based antineoplastic agents are sometimes described as "alkylating-like" due to similar effects as alkylating antineoplastic agents, although they do not have an alkyl group.

== Examples ==
Strategies for improving platinum-based anticancer drugs usually involve changes in the neutral spectator ligands, changes in the nature of the anions (halides vs various carboxylates), or changes in the oxidation state of the metal (Pt(II) vs Pt(IV)). Nanotechnology has been explored to deliver platinum more efficiently in the case of lipoplatin, which is introduced into the tumor sites thereby reducing the chance of toxicity.

Cisplatin was the first to be developed. Cisplatin is particularly effective against testicular cancer; the cure rate was improved from 10% to 85%. Similarly, the addition of cisplatin to adjuvant chemotherapy led to a marked increase in disease-free survival rates for patients with medulloblastoma - again, up to around 85%. This application of cisplatin was developed by pediatric oncologist Roger Packer in the early 1980s.

Approved platinum-based anticancer drugs

cisplatin

carboplatin

oxaliplatin

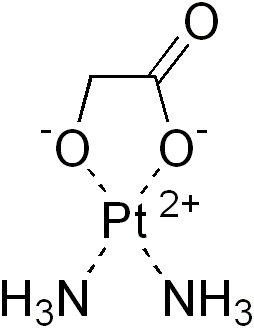
nedaplatin

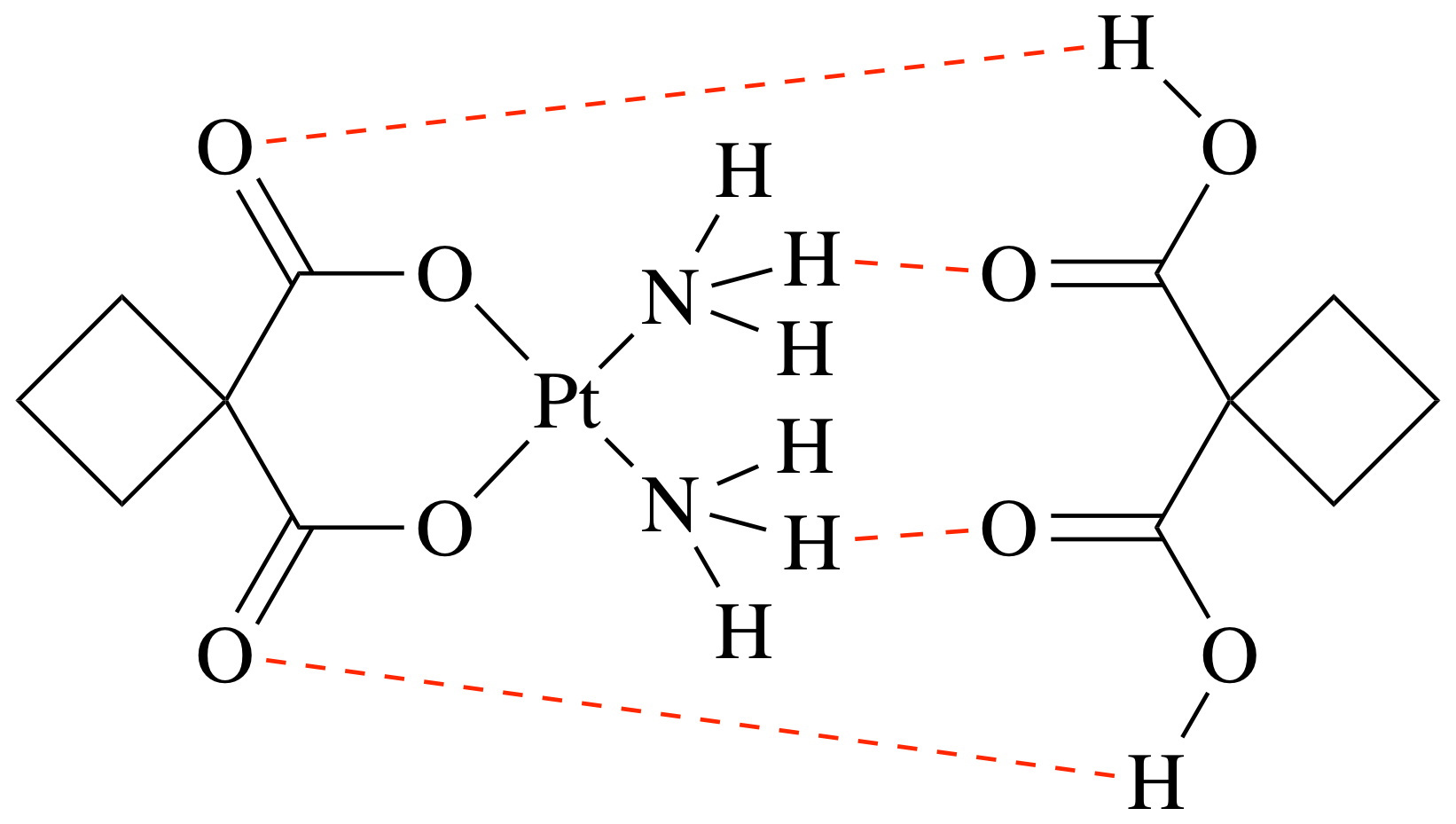
Dicycloplatin
Platinum-based anticancer drugs in trials

triplatin tetranitrate

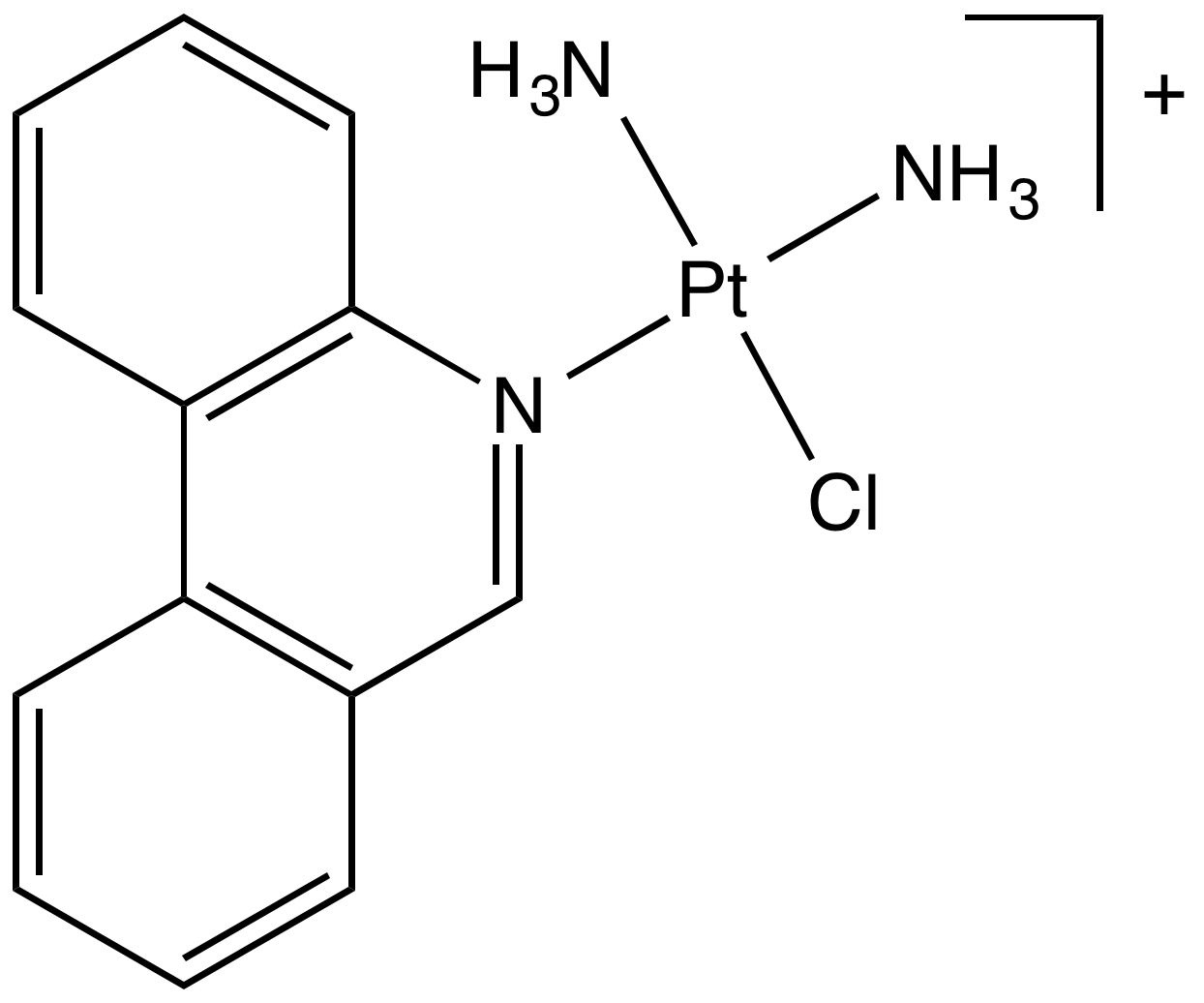
phenanthriplatin, a proposed new anticancer drug.

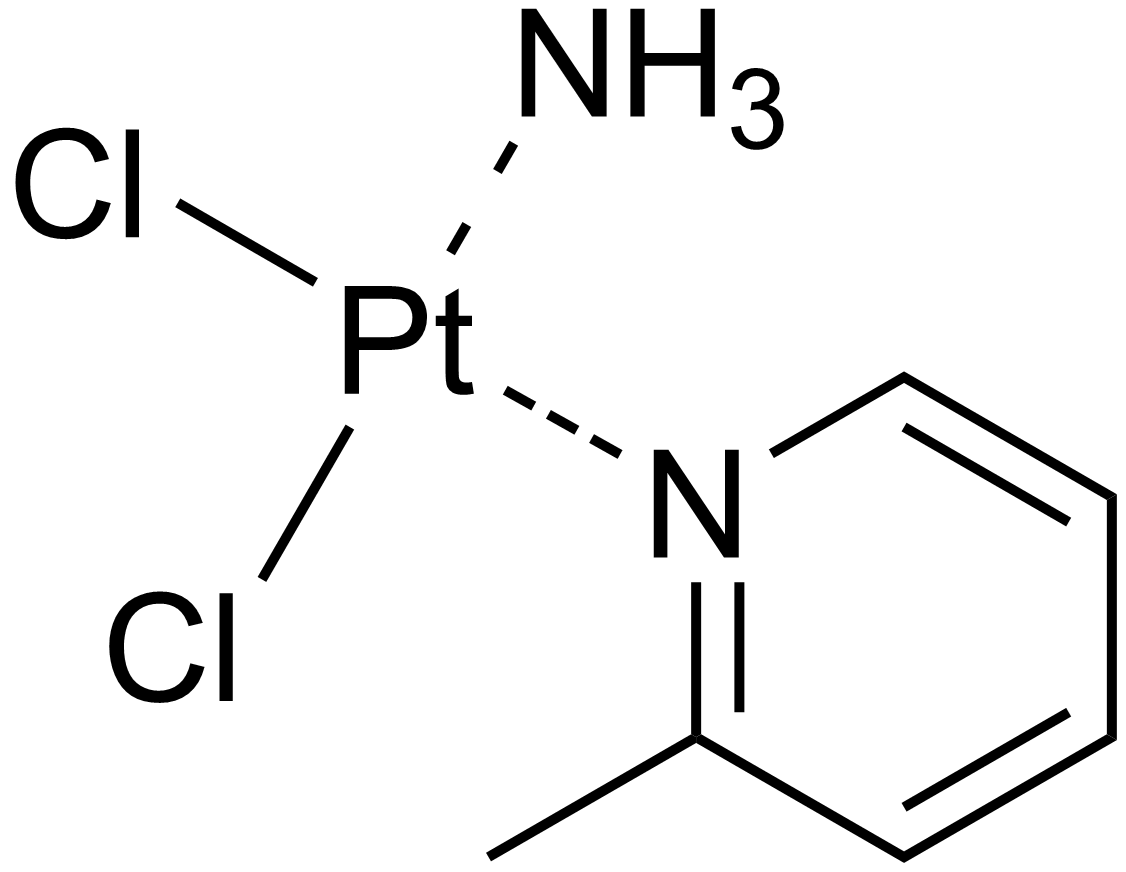
picoplatin, which remains in trials

satraplatin
- Pyriplatin
- Lobaplatin
