= Lobaplatin =

Chemical compound

Clinical data
- Routes of administration: IV Bolus Injections or Infusion

Identifiers
- IUPAC name: 1,2-diammino-methy lcyclobutane-platinum (II) lactate
- CAS Number: 135558-11-1
- PubChem CID: 10000860
- DrugBank: DB13049
- ChemSpider: 8176441
- UNII: OX5XK1JD8C
- ChEBI: CHEBI:192744
- CompTox Dashboard (EPA): DTXSID50929050

Chemical and physical data
- Formula: C_{9}H_{18}N_{2}O_{3}Pt
- Molar mass: 397.338 g·mol^{−1}
- Melting point: 220 °C (428 °F)
- Solubility in water: 72.9 mg/mL (20 °C)

Lobaplatin is a platinum-based antineoplastic metallodrug approved exclusively in China for the treatment of small cell lung cancer, inoperable metastatic breast cancer and chronic myelogenous leukaemia. The drug is a third-generation analogue of cisplatin, the first globally approved and widely used platinum-based anticancer drug.

Pharmacodynamics studies of lobaplatin found greater anticancer activity and lower toxicity than cisplatin and carboplatin, and showed activity against cisplatin-resistant cancer cells. However, global approval of lobaplatin is restricted due to limited evidence of efficacy.

== Structure ==
The structure of lobaplatin (1,2-diammino-methyl-cyclobutane-platinum (II) lactate) consists of a platinum(II) metal center coordinated to a bidentate amine ligand (1,2-bis(aminomethyl)cyclobutane) and a lactic acid leaving group. Lobaplatin is administered intravenously by bolus injection or infusion and composed of an approximate 50/50 mixture of two diastereoisomers, R,R,S- and S,S,S-configurations.

== Mechanism of action ==
The mechanism of antineoplastic action for lobaplatin has not been studied in great detail. The results of current mechanistic studies suggest that lobaplatin is a DNA cross linking antineoplastic agent and has a similar platinum-induced cytotoxicity mechanism to other platin metallodrugs (i.e., cisplatin and oxaliplatin).

Lobaplatin acts as a pro-drug, it is hydrolyzed in the body forming an active form that is able to interact with DNA. Specifically, when lobaplatin is hydrolyzed the lactate ligand is protonated and dissociates as lactic acid, forming a charged and highly reactive platinum complex that coordinates with the N-donors of DNA bases and inhibits DNA synthesis. In its reactive (active) form, the platinum metal center is able to form DNA-adducts through inter- and intra-strand cross-links with two adjacent guanine-guanine (GG) or two guanine-adenine (GA) bases, inducing apoptosis and inhibition of cell growth. Lobaplatin has been shown to affect the expression of the c-myc gene, which is associated with apoptosis and cell proliferation.

== Toxicity and side effects ==
The toxicity of platinum-based drugs is highly dependent on how easily the leaving group(s) are hydrolyzed, leaving groups that easily dissociate are significantly more toxic than more stable leaving groups that don't easily disassociate. Due to the good stability of the lactic acid leaving group, lobaplatin is more stable and therefore less toxic than first and second generation platinum-based drugs.

The toxicity of lobaplatin is common across multiple clinical trials, 60 mg/m^{2} (body surface area) per 3–4 weeks is the maximum tolerated dose and the dose-limiting toxicity is thrombocytopenia. Common side effects include agranulocytosis, thrombocytopenia, anaemia, leukopenia, nausea and vomiting.

== History ==
Lobaplatin was first synthesized and developed by ASTA Pharma in Germany in 1990, under the research name D-19466. Discontinued development of lobaplatin by ASTA Pharma lead to further development of the drug by Zentaris AG (AEterna Laboratories). In 2003, Zentaris AG signed a contract with Hainan Tianwang International Pharmaceutical for the manufacturing and marketing of lobaplatin in China. In 2010, lobaplatin was approved for clinical use in china, according to China Food and Drug Administration.
