= Triplatin tetranitrate =

Chemical compound

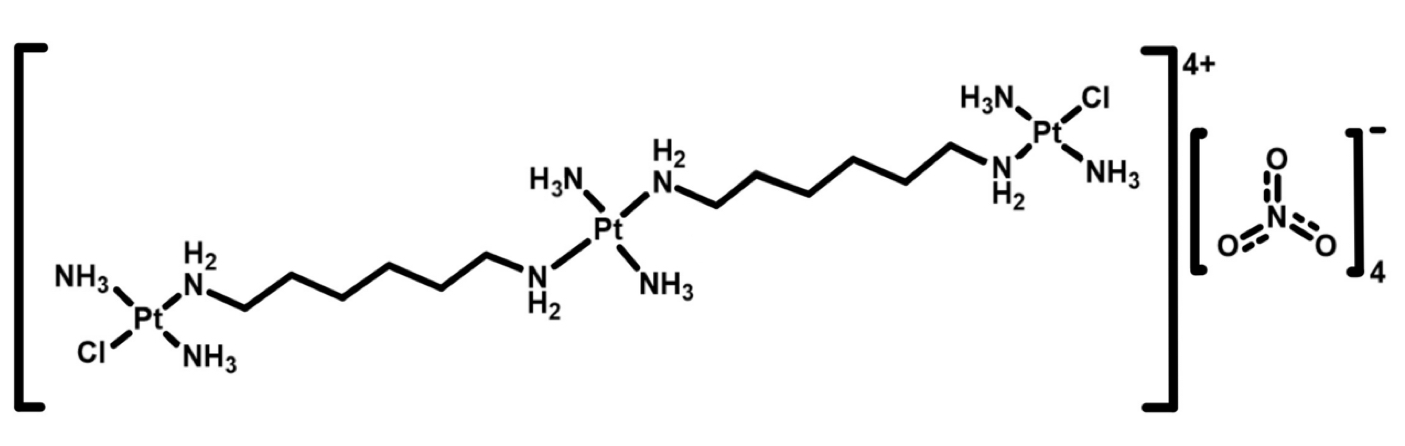

Clinical data
- ATC code: none

Identifiers
- CAS Number: 172903-00-3
- PubChem CID: 91825660
- ChemSpider: 34999760
- UNII: HAJ1000ARC
- ChEBI: CHEBI:85611

Chemical and physical data
- Formula: C_{12}H_{50}Cl_{2}N_{14}O_{12}Pt_{3}
- Molar mass: 1238.77 g·mol^{−1}
- 3D model (JSmol): Interactive image
- SMILES: [O-][N+]([O-])=O.[O-][N+]([O-])=O.Cl[Pt-2]([NH3+])([NH3+])[NH2+]CCCCCC[NH2+][Pt-2]([NH3+])([NH3+])[NH2+]CCCCCC[NH2+][Pt-2]([NH3+])([NH3+])Cl.[O-][N+]([O-])=O.[O-][N+]([O-])=O
- InChI: InChI=1S/2C6H16N2.2ClH.4NO3.6H3N.3Pt/c2*7-5-3-1-2-4-6-8;;;4*2-1(3)4;;;;;;;;;/h2*1-8H2;2*1H;;;;;6*1H3;;;/q;;;;4*-1;;;;;;;3*+2/p-2; Key:RMFNGLHOFHJMHN-UHFFFAOYSA-L

Triplatin tetranitrate (rINN; also known as BBR3464) is a platinum-based cytotoxic drug that underwent clinical trials for the treatment of human cancer. The drug acts by forming adducts with cellular DNA, preventing DNA transcription and replication, thereby inducing apoptosis. Other platinum-containing anticancer drugs include cisplatin, carboplatin, and oxaliplatin.

== Drug development ==
Triplatin belongs to the anticancer class of polynuclear platinum complexes (PPCs), developed in the laboratory of Professor Nicholas Farrell, where one or more platinum centers are linked by amine ligands. BBR3464 was patented in the mid-1990s and clinical development and licensing was performed initially by Boehringer Mannheim Italia and eventually by the pharmaceutical company Roche, when clinical development was led by Novuspharma. In preclinical trials it demonstrated cytotoxic activity in cancer cell lines that had either intrinsic or acquired resistance to cisplatin. Triplatin remains the only “non-classical” platinum drug (not based on the cisplatin structure) to have entered human clinical trials. Phase I and Phase II clinical results have been summarized.

== Mode of action ==
The main target of triplatin is cellular DNA, similar to cisplatin. The drug forms novel adducts with DNA, structurally distinct from those formed by cisplatin. More recently, cellular accumulation mediated by heparan sulfate proteoglycans and high-affinity glycosaminoglycan (GAG) binding indicates that cationic PPCs are intrinsically dual-function agents, acting by mechanisms discrete from the neutral, mononuclear agents.

== Side effects ==
In phase I studies, when given once every 28 days, the main dose-limiting toxicities (DLT) of Triplatin (BBR 3464) were neutropenia and diarrhea encountered at a dose level of 1.1 mg/m2. Diarrhea was treatable with loperamide. Lack of nephrotoxicity and low urinary excretion supported use of drug without hydration.
