= Satraplatin =

Chemical compound

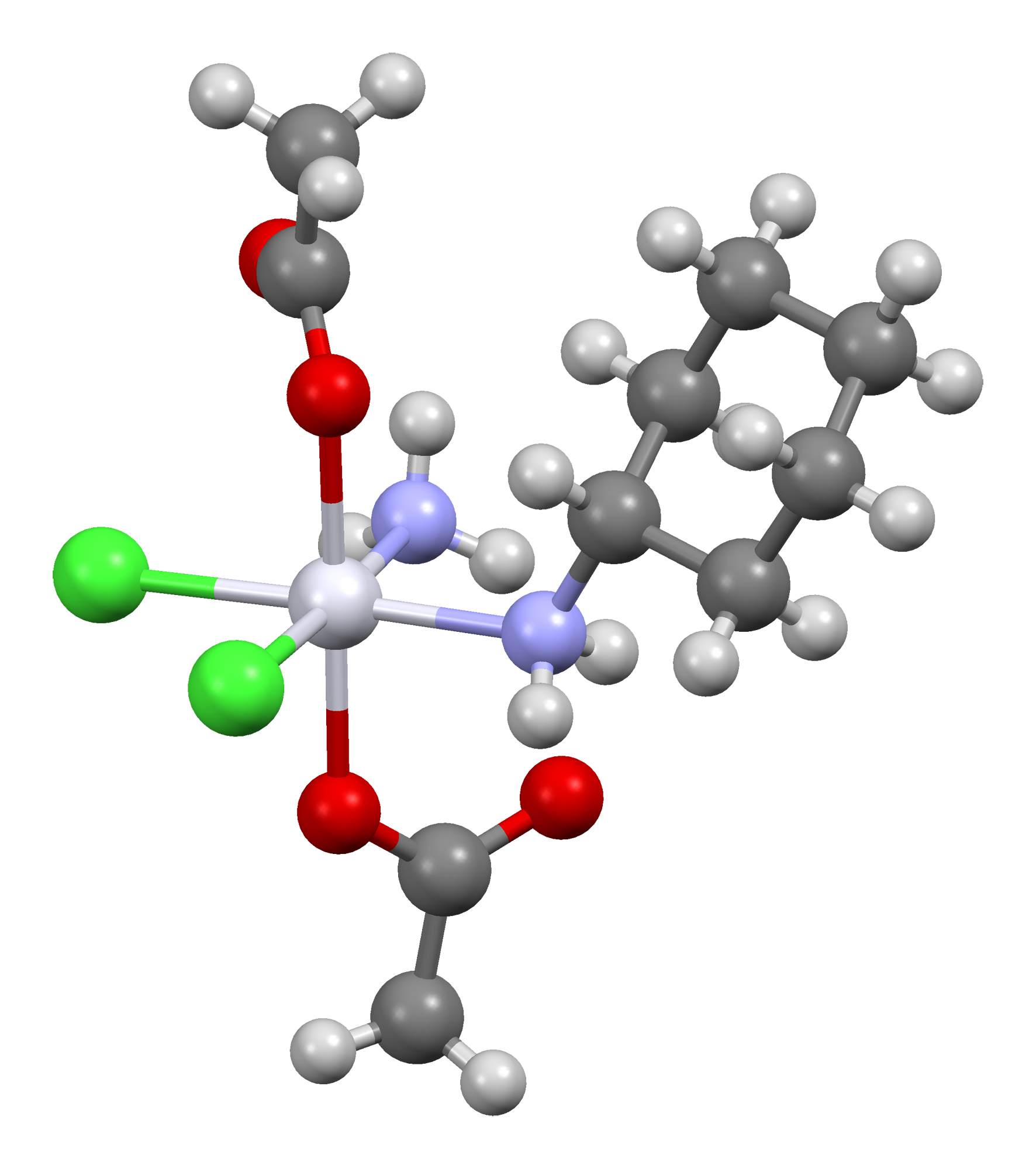

Clinical data
- Other names: BMY 45594; BMS 182751 (OC-6-43)-bis(acetato)amminedichlorocyclohexylamine platinum(IV)
- Routes of administration: Oral
- ATC code: L01XA04 (WHO)

Identifiers
- IUPAC name: (OC-6-43)-bis(acetato)amminedichloro(cyclohexylamine)platinum
- CAS Number: 129580-63-8
- PubChem CID: 123974
- UNII: 8D7B37T28G
- ChEBI: CHEBI:85609
- CompTox Dashboard (EPA): DTXSID00926438

Chemical and physical data
- Formula: C_{10}H_{22}Cl_{2}N_{2}O_{4}Pt
- Molar mass: 500.28 g·mol^{−1}
- 3D model (JSmol): Interactive image
- SMILES: [Pt@OH4](Cl)(Cl)(OC(=O)C)(OC(=O)C)([NH3])[NH2]C1CCCCC1

Satraplatin (INN, codenamed JM216) is a platinum-based antineoplastic agent that was under investigation as a treatment of patients with advanced prostate cancer who have failed previous chemotherapy. It has not yet received approval from the U.S. Food and Drug Administration. First mentioned in the medical literature in 1993, satraplatin is the first orally active platinum-based chemotherapeutic drug; other available platinum analogues—cisplatin, carboplatin, and oxaliplatin—must be given intravenously.

The drug has also been used in the treatment of lung and ovarian cancers. The proposed mode of action is that the compound binds to the DNA of cancer cells rendering them incapable of dividing.

== Mode of action ==
The proposed mode of action is that the compound binds to the DNA of cancer cells rendering them incapable of dividing. In addition some cisplatin resistant tumour cell lines were sensitive to satraplatin treatment in vitro. This may be due to an altered mechanism of cellular uptake (satraplatin by passive diffusion instead of active transport for e.g. cisplatin).

== Clinical development ==
Satraplatin has been developed for the treatment of men with castrate-refractory, metastatic prostate cancer for several reasons. Its relative ease of administration, potential lack of cross-resistance with other platinum agents, clinical benefits seen in early studies of prostate cancer, and an unmet need in this patient population after Docetaxel failure at that time. The only Phase III trial with satraplatin (SPARC Trial) was conducted in pretreated metastatic castrate-resistant prostate cancer (CRPC), revealing a 33% reduction in risk of progression or death versus a placebo. However, no difference in overall survival was observed. An FDA or EMA-approved indication has not yet been achieved.

Satraplatin appears to have clinical activity against a variety of malignancies such as Breast Cancer, Prostate cancer and Lung cancer.

Especially in combination with radiotherapy it appears to have good efficacy in combination for lung and squamous head and neck cancer. In a phase I study from Vanderbilt University, seven of eight patients with squamous cell carcinoma of the head and neck, who were treated with 10 to 30 mg of satraplatin thrice a week concurrently with radiotherapy achieved a complete response.

== Side effects ==
Satraplatin is similar in toxicity profile to carboplatin, with no nephrotoxicity, neurotoxicity, or ototoxicity observed. Moreover, it is much better tolerated than cisplatin and does not require hydration for each dose. A somewhat more intense hematotoxicity is observed. Anemia, diarrhea, constipation, nausea or vomiting, increase risk of infection, bruising.

== Possible risks and complications ==
- Thrombus: Cancer can increase the risk of developing a blood clot, and chemotherapy may increase this risk further. A blood clot may cause symptoms such as pain, redness and swelling in a leg, or breathlessness and chest pain. Most clots can be treated with drugs that thin the blood.
- Fertility: Satraplatin can affect a person's ability to become pregnant and may cause sterility in men.
- Use Contraception: Satraplatin may harm a developing baby. It is important to use effective contraception while taking this drug and for at least a few months afterwards

== Detailed mechanism of action ==
Many human tumors including testicular, bladder, lung, head, neck, and cervical cancers have been treated with platinum compounds. All of the marketed platinum analogues must be administered via intravenous infusion is one of the main disadvantages for these platinum compounds due to severe, dose-limiting effects. An acquired resistance to cisplatin/carboplatin in ovarian cancer was discovered due to insufficient amounts of platinum reaching the target DNA or failure to achieve cell death. These drawbacks led to the development of the next generation of platinum analogues such as satraplatin

Satraplatin is a prodrug, meaning it is metabolized in the body and transformed into its working form. The two polar acetate groups on satraplatin increase the drugs bioavailability, which in turn allows for a large fraction of the administered dose to make it into the bloodstream where metabolism begins. Once the molecule makes it to the bloodstream the drug loses its acetate groups. At this point the drug is structurally similar to cisplatin with the exception of one cyclohexylamine group in place of an amine group. Since the drug is now structurally similar to cisplatin its mechanism of action is also very similar. The chlorine atoms are displaced and the platinum atom in the drug binds to guanine residues in DNA. This unfortunately happens to not only cancer cells but other regular functioning cells as well causing some of the harsh side effects. By binding to guanine residues satraplatin inhibits DNA replication and transcription which leads to subsequent apoptosis. Where satraplatin differs is its cyclohexamine group. In cisplatin the two amine groups are symmetrical while satraplatin's cyclohexamine makes it asymmetrical which contributes to some of the drug's special properties.

A large problem with cisplatin and other platinum based anti-cancer drugs is that the body can develop resistance to them. A major way that this happens is through a mammalian nucleotide excision repair pathway which repairs damaged DNA. However, some studies show that satraplatin compared to other platinum anti-cancer drugs can be elusive and are not recognized by the DNA repair proteins due to the different adducts on the molecule (cyclohexamine). Since satraplatin is not recognized by the DNA repair proteins the DNA remains damaged, the DNA cannot be replicated, the cell dies, and the problem of resistance is solved.

In vitro experiments have shown that satraplatin is more effective in well-defined hematological cancers than cisplatin. MTAP deficiency and Bcl-2 gene mutation were identified as biomarkers of enhanced efficacy.
