= Chemotherapy-induced hyperpigmentation =

- Specialty: Dermatology

Chemotherapy-induced hyperpigmentation is caused by many chemotherapeutic agents (especially the antibiotics bleomycin, and daunorubicin) and the alkylating agents (cyclophosphamide and busulfan).

== See also ==
- Skin lesion
