= Phenanthriplatin =

Chemical compound

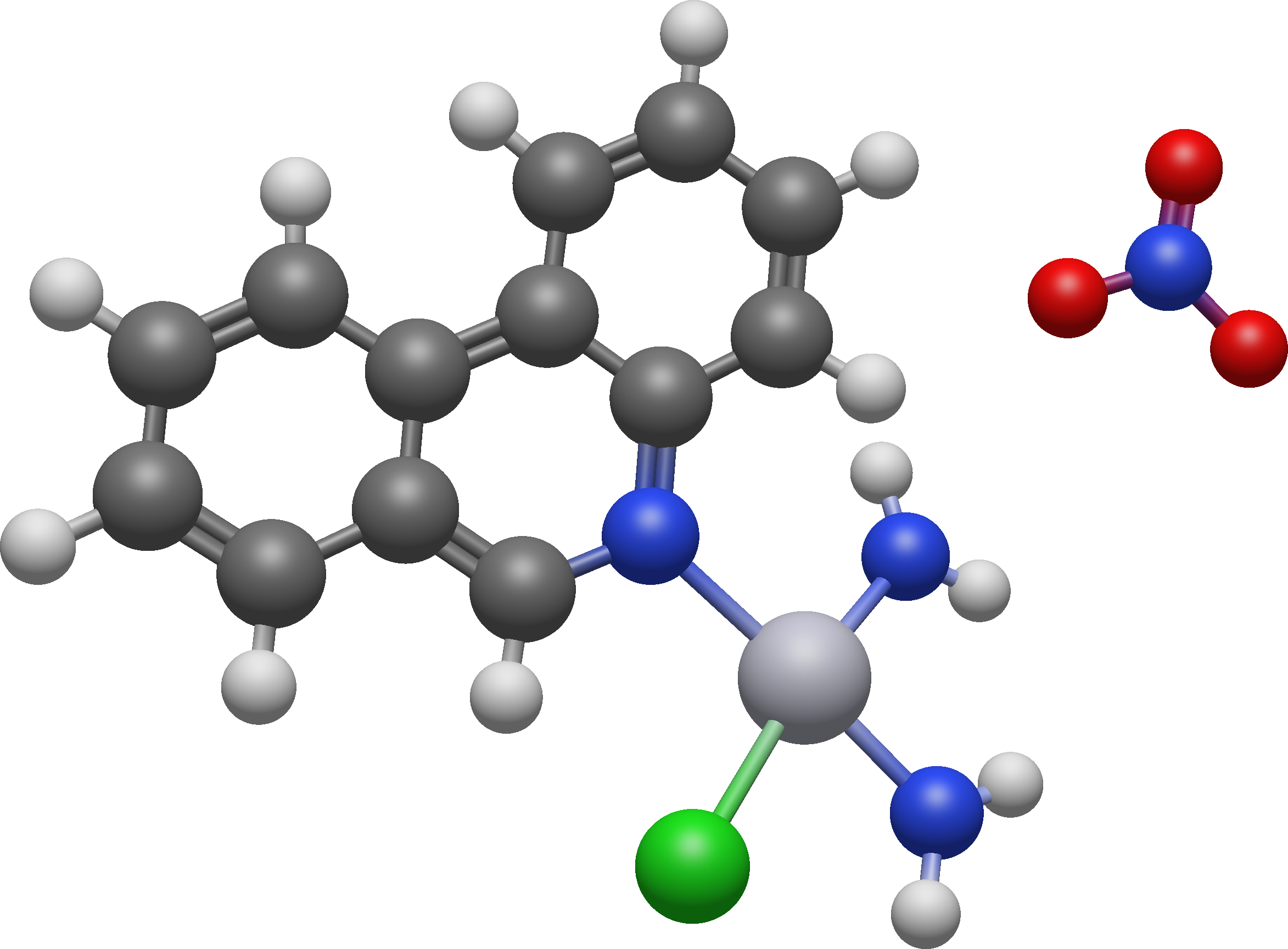

Clinical data
- ATC code: none

Identifiers
- IUPAC name: cis-[Pt(NH_{3})_{2}-(phenanthridine)Cl]NO_{3}
- CAS Number: 1416900-51-0

Chemical and physical data
- Formula: C_{13}H_{15}ClN_{4}O_{3}Pt
- Molar mass: 505.82 g·mol^{−1}
- 3D model (JSmol): Interactive image
- SMILES: Cl[Pt-2]([NH3+])([NH3+])[n+]0c1ccccc1c2ccccc2c0.[O-][N+]([O-])=O

Phenanthriplatin or cis-[Pt(NH_{3})_{2}-(phenanthridine)Cl]NO_{3} is a new drug candidate. It belongs to a family of platinum(II)-based agents which includes cisplatin, oxaliplatin and carboplatin. Phenanthriplatin was discovered by Professor Stephen J. Lippard at Massachusetts Institute of Technology and is currently being developed by Blend Therapeutics for its potential use in human cancer therapy.

== Structure and synthesis ==
Structurally, phenanthriplatin is similar to cisplatin, differing only in the presence of a phenanthridine ligand instead of a chloride in its structure.

To synthesise phenanthriplatin, one equivalent of silver nitrate is added to a solution of cisplatin in dimethylformamide. The mixture is stirred at 55 °C away from light and the resulting silver chloride precipitate is filtered out. Next, phenanthridine is added to the supernatant and this is also mixed at 55 °C for 16 hours. The reaction mixture is then rotary evaporated to dryness and the residue is dissolved in methanol. Undissolved cisplatin is filtered out and diethyl ether is added to the filtrate to precipitate out phenanthriplatin crystals. Phenanthriplatin is then collected by filtration, washed twice with diethyl ether before dissolving it in methanol. The drug is precipitated by adding it dropwise to a vigorously stirred solution of diethyl ether. The pure drug is then collected by vacuum filtration and dried in vacuo.

== Mechanism of action ==
Phenanthriplatin is thought to penetrate cell membranes in its ionised form by either passive diffusion or carrier-mediated active transport. The hydrophobic phenanthridine ligand of the drug is thought to maximise its cellular uptake, rendering it more effective and cytotoxic compared with cisplatin. Once it has entered the cell, phenanthriplatin is distributed in a similar manner to other platinum-based anticancer agents, residing primarily in the cell's nucleus. The ultimate target of the drug is nuclear DNA.

Phenanthriplatin forms monofunctional adducts with guanosine residues in the DNA. The large and hydrophobic nature of the phenanthridine ligand introduces steric hindrance within the major groove of the DNA, which impedes RNA polymerase II, a major protein used by the cell to transcribe DNA. Since transcription is essential for DNA synthesis and gene expression, phenanthriplatin inhibits both these processes in cancerous cells, ultimately inducing cellular apoptosis.

A study examining the effects of monofunctional adducts on bacterial growth reported a significant decrease in Escherichia coli (E. coli) cell growth when inoculated with phenanthriplatin. It also demonstrated that phenanthriplatin, like cisplatin, was able to dissolve lysogens as well as alter the morphology of E. coli into longer, filamentous cells. These results confirm that the drug’s anticancer activity is exerted through interacting with cells’ DNA. Phenanthriplatin has been reported to have increased selectivity to cancerous cells compared to healthy cells, thereby reducing toxic side effects usually associated with current anticancer drugs and further supporting its potential use in chemotherapy. It has also been shown to have a lower tendency to react with other molecules in the body. Studies have reported that phenanthriplatin bound N-acetyl methionine, a sulphur-containing molecule, at a much lower rate compared to other monofunctional platinum adducts. This allows the drug to remain intact, facilitating its entry into the cell’s nucleus to effectively exert its anticancer activity.
