= Cadonilimab =

Monoclonal antibody

Monoclonal antibody
- Type: ?

Clinical data
- Other names: AK104; AK-104

Legal status
- Legal status: Investigational

Identifiers
- CAS Number: 2394841-59-7
- PubChem SID: 497620603
- DrugBank: DB16680
- UNII: 6FYG1DS4NW
- KEGG: D12190

Chemical and physical data
- Formula: C_{8772}H_{13504}N_{2384}O_{2768}S_{62}
- Molar mass: 198638.16 g·mol^{−1}

Cadonilimab is a PD-1/CTLA-4 bispecific monoclonal antibody developed to treat a variety of solid cancer types. In June, 2022 it was approved in China "for use in patients with relapsed or metastatic cervical cancer (r/mCC) who have progressed on or after platinum-based chemotherapy".
