= CAPOX =

Chemotherapy regimen

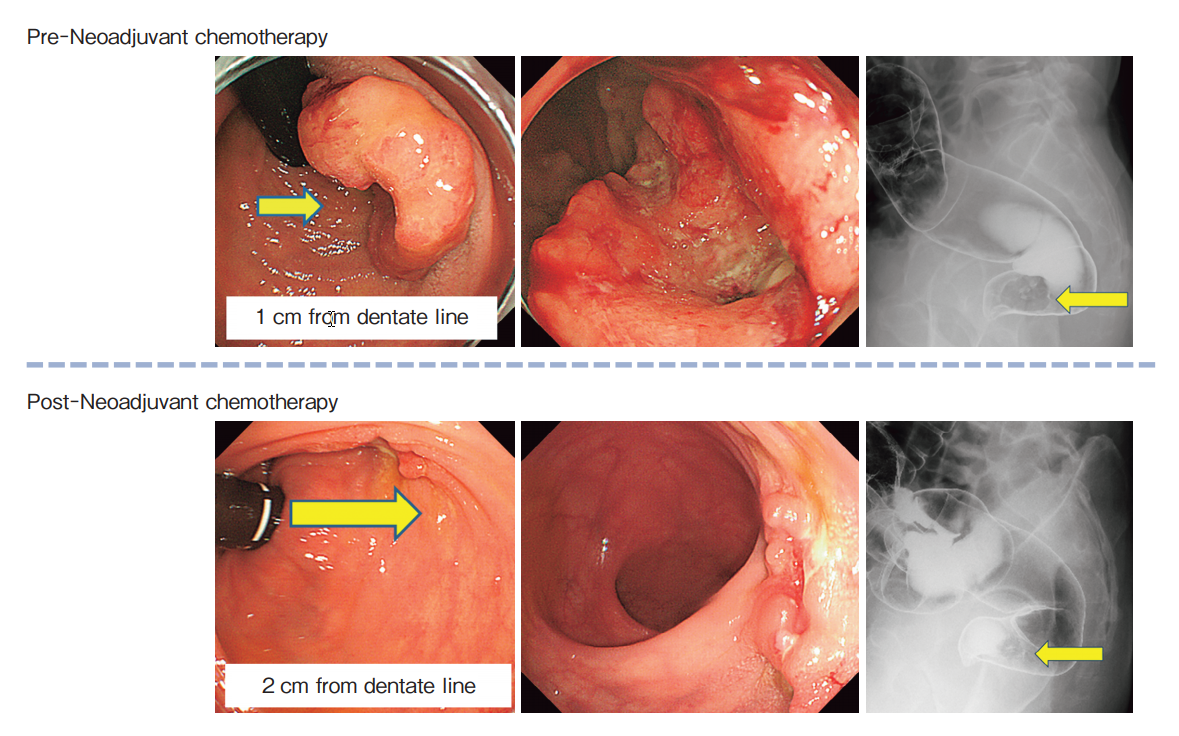
Pre- and post-chemotherapy images of a T3 N1 M0 cStage IIIa colorectal cancer. Four courses of CAPOX therapy.

CAPOX (also called XELOX) is a chemotherapy regimen consisting of capecitabine (trade name Xeloda) combined with oxaliplatin.

Xelox regime operates in 3-week cycles, usually with 8 cycles in total; Xeloda is taken orally twice daily for two weeks, while oxaliplatin is administered by IV on the first day of the cycle; there is a one-week rest period before the next cycle.

== Adverse effects ==
- Neuropathy
- Diarrhea
