= Alkyl sulfonate =

Organic compound that contains a sulfonate group

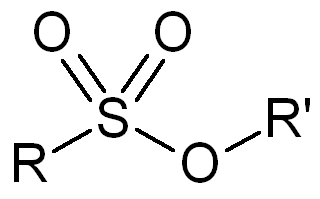

Alkyl sulfonates are esters of alkane sulfonic acids with the general formula R-SO_{2}-O-R'. They act as alkylating agents, some of them are used as alkylating antineoplastic agents in the treatment of cancer, e.g. Busulfan.
