= Mitozolomide =

Chemical compound

Clinical data
- ATC code: none

Identifiers
- IUPAC name: 3-(2-chloroethyl)-4-oxo-3,4-dihydroimidazo[5,1-d][1,2,3,5]tetrazine-8-carboxamide
- CAS Number: 85622-95-3
- PubChem CID: 71766
- ChemSpider: 64805
- UNII: E3U7286V3W
- ChEMBL: ChEMBL435951
- CompTox Dashboard (EPA): DTXSID40234862
- ECHA InfoCard: 100.079.921

Chemical and physical data
- Formula: C_{7}H_{7}ClN_{6}O_{2}
- Molar mass: 242.62 g·mol^{−1}
- 3D model (JSmol): Interactive image
- SMILES: NC(=O)c1ncn2C(=O)N(CCCl)\N=N/c12
- InChI: InChI=1S/C7H7ClN6O2/c8-1-2-14-7(16)13-3-10-4(5(9)15)6(13)11-12-14/h3H,1-2H2,(H2,9,15); Key:QXYYYPFGTSJXNS-UHFFFAOYSA-N

Mitozolomide (INN) is an antineoplastic. It is an imidazotetrazine derivative.

Development of mitozolomide was discontinued during Phase II clinical trials after it was found to cause severe and unpredictable bone marrow suppression. Temozolomide, which has been in clinical use since 1999, is a less toxic analogue of mitozolomide.
