= Busulfan =

Chemical compound

Clinical data
- Trade names: Myleran, Busilvex, Busulfex IV
- Other names: 1,4-butanediol dimethanesulfonate
- AHFS/Drugs.com: Monograph
- MedlinePlus: a682248
- License data: EU EMA: by INN; US DailyMed: Busulfan; US FDA: Busulfan
- Pregnancy category: AU: D
- Routes of administration: By mouth, intravenous
- ATC code: L01AB01 (WHO)

Legal status
- Legal status: AU: S4 (Prescription only); CA: ℞-only; UK: POM (Prescription only); US: ℞-only; EU: Rx-only

Pharmacokinetic data
- Bioavailability: 60–80% (oral)
- Protein binding: 32.4%
- Metabolism: Liver
- Elimination half-life: 2.5 hours
- Excretion: Urine (25–60%)

Identifiers
- IUPAC name: Butane-1,4-diyl dimethanesulfonate
- CAS Number: 55-98-1
- PubChem CID: 2478
- IUPHAR/BPS: 7136
- DrugBank: DB01008
- ChemSpider: 2384
- UNII: G1LN9045DK
- KEGG: D00248
- ChEBI: CHEBI:28901
- ChEMBL: ChEMBL820
- CompTox Dashboard (EPA): DTXSID3020910
- ECHA InfoCard: 100.000.228

Chemical and physical data
- Formula: C_{6}H_{14}O_{6}S_{2}
- Molar mass: 246.29 g·mol^{−1}
- 3D model (JSmol): Interactive image
- SMILES: CS(=O)(=O)OCCCCOS(=O)(=O)C
- InChI: InChI=1S/C6H14O6S2/c1-13(7,8)11-5-3-4-6-12-14(2,9)10/h3-6H2,1-2H3; Key:COVZYZSDYWQREU-UHFFFAOYSA-N

Busulfan (Myleran, GlaxoSmithKline; Busulfex IV, Otsuka America Pharmaceutical, Inc.) is a chemotherapy drug that has been in use since 1959. It is a cell cycle-nonspecific alkylating antineoplastic agent belonging to the alkyl sulfonates class. Its chemical designation is 1,4-butanediol dimethanesulfonate.

== Medical uses ==
Busulfan is used in pediatrics and adults in combination with cyclophosphamide or fludarabine/clofarabine as a conditioning agent prior to bone marrow transplantation, especially in chronic myelogenous leukemia (CML) and other leukemias, lymphomas, and myeloproliferative disorders. Busulfan can control tumor burden but cannot prevent transformation or correct cytogenic abnormalities.

Busulfan was formerly used as a palliative treatment for chronic myeloid leukemia (CML). Its role in the routine treatment of CML declined following the introduction for tyrosine kinase inhibitors, beginning with imatinib in 2001. Current CML treatment is based primarily on tyrosine kinase inhibitors, while busulfan remains in use mainly as part of conditioning regimens before hematopoietic stem-cell transplantation.

=== Available forms ===
The intravenous formulation, marketed as Busulfex, received approval from the United States Food and Drug Administration (FDA) in 1999 for use with cyclophosphamide as a conditioning regimen before allogeneic hematopoietic progenitor cell transplantation in patients with chronic myeloid leukemia (CML). It had received orphan-drug designation for preparative therapy associated with bone-marrow transplantation in 1994.

Myleran is supplied in white film coated tablets with 2 mg of busulfan per tablet. After 2002, a great interest has appeared for intravenous presentations of busulfan. Busulfex is supplied as an intravenous solution with 6 mg/ml busulfan. Busulfex has proved equally effective as oral busulfan, with presumedly less toxic side effects. Pharmacokinetic and dynamic studies support this use, that has prompted its usage in transplantation regimes, particularly in frail patients. Fludarabine + busulfan is a typical example of this use.

Busulfan is used as an adjunct therapy with cyclophosphamide or other chemotherapeutic agents for conditioning prior to bone marrow transplantation. In adults and children >34 kg, intravenous (IV) busulfan (Bulsulfex) is commonly dosed at 3.2 mg/kg/day administered every six hours (4 times daily) or 24 hours (once daily). Once daily dosing is commonly administered over 3 hours while four times daily is commonly administered over two hours. Both IV and oral formulations require prophylactic antiemetic agents administered prior to the busulfan dose and scheduled antiemetics administered thereafter. Oral bioavailability of busulfan shows a large interindividual variation. Taking busulfan on an empty stomach is recommended to reduce the risk of nausea and emesis.

== Side effects ==
Toxicity may include interstitial pulmonary fibrosis ("busulfan lung"), hyperpigmentation, seizures, hepatic veno-occlusive disease (VOD) or sinusoidal obstruction syndrome (SOS), emesis, and wasting syndrome. Busulfan also induces impotence in males (kills germ cells), thrombocytopenia, a condition of lowered blood platelet count and activity, and sometimes medullary aplasia. Seizures and VOD are serious concerns with busulfan therapy and prophylaxis is often utilized to avoid these effects. Hepatic VOD is a dose-limiting toxicity. Symptoms of VOD include weight gain, elevated bilirubin, painful hepatomegaly, and edema. The reason busulfan causes VOD is mostly unknown and can be deadly. Ursodiol may be considered for prophylaxis of veno-occlusive disease.

Antiemetics are often administered prior to busulfan to prevent vomiting (emesis).

Phenytoin may be used concurrently to prevent the seizures. Levetiracetam has shown efficacy for prophylaxis against busulfan-induced seizures. Benzodiazepines can also be used for busulfan-induced seizures.

Busulfan is listed by the IARC as a Group 1 carcinogen.

== Drug interactions ==
Busulfan is metabolized via glutathione conjugation in the liver to inactive metabolites. Itraconazole can decrease busulfan clearance by up to 25%, resulting in AUC levels >1500 micromolxmin and increased risk of hepatic VOD. Concomitant use of acetaminophen within 72 hours of busulfan use can reduce busulfan clearance (resulting in increased busulfan AUC), as acetaminophen is also metabolized via glutathione and may deplete stores. Phenytoin increases hepatic clearance of busulfan (resulting in decreased busulfan AUC). However, clinical studies of busulfan were completed with patients taking phenytoin, so no empiric dose adjustment is necessary if patients are taking phenytoin with busulfan.

== Pharmacology ==
=== Pharmacokinetics ===
Peak plasma concentrations are achieved within one hour of oral administration. About 30% of the drug is bound to plasma proteins, such as albumin.

Busulfan exhibits high interindividual pharmacokinetic variability, narrow therapeutic window, and a well-established correlation between pharmacokinetics and pharmacodynamics. In fact, the cumulative area under the curve over the treatment period (AUC_{0-4} days) is highly correlated with treatment outcomes. While subtherapeutic exposure increases the risk of graft failure and disease relapse, supratherapeutic exposures increases the risk of treatment related toxicity, mainly in the form of hepatic Veno occlusive disease (VOD). Therefore, therapeutic drug monitoring and model-informed precision dosing are widely recommended to individualize busulfan dosing.

Busulfan exposure is assessed using the area under the plasma concentration–time curve (AUC), rather than a single trough concentration. AUC may be estimated from multiple concentration measurements using noncompartmental pharmacokinetic methods or population pharmacokinetic and Bayesian approaches with limited sampling strategies. The target cumulative busulfan exposure varies depending on the underlying disease and transplantation setting, with target cumulative AUC over the four days of treatment generally ranging from 78 to 100 mg*h/L.

=== Pharmacodynamics ===
Busulfan is an alkylsulfonate. It is an alkylating agent that forms DNA-DNA interstrand crosslinks between the DNA bases guanine and adenine and between guanine and guanine. This occurs through an SN2 reaction in which the relatively nucleophilic guanine N7 attacks the carbon adjacent to the mesylate leaving group. DNA crosslinking prevents DNA replication. Because the intrastrand DNA crosslinks cannot be repaired by cellular machinery, the cell undergoes apoptosis.

== Research ==
The drug was recently used in a study to examine the role of platelet-transported serotonin in liver regeneration.

The molecular recognition of ureido-cyclodextrin with busulfan was investigated. The formation of complexes was observed with electrostatic interactions between urea and the sulfonate part of busulfan.

Another structure was used for this complexation type, two disaccharidyl units connected by urea linkers to a diazacrown ether organizing platform.
