= Picoplatin =

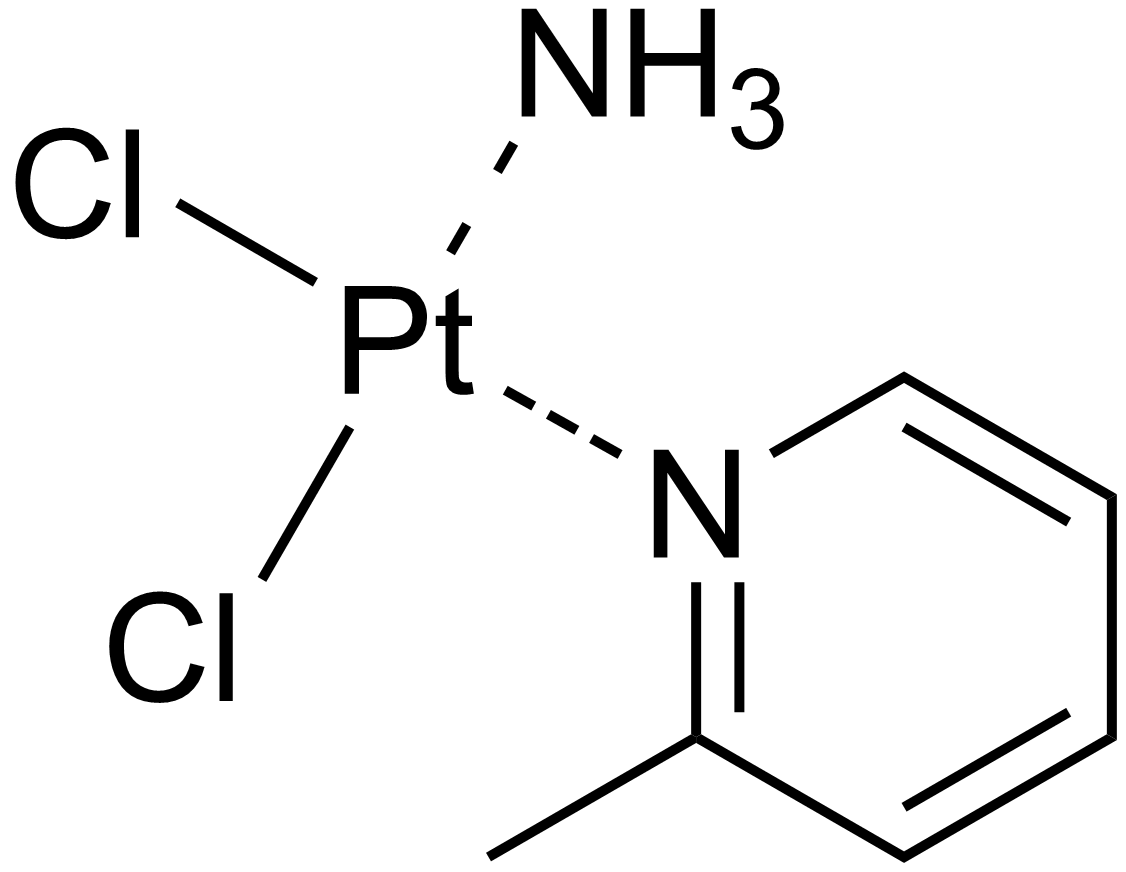

Names
- IUPAC name azane; 2-methylpyridine; platinum(2+); dichloride

Identifiers
CAS Number	181630-15-9
3D model (JSmol)	ionic form: Interactive image; coordination form: Interactive image
ChemSpider	154428
ECHA InfoCard	100.205.233
PubChem CID	177358
UNII	B5TAN0L720
CompTox Dashboard (EPA)	DTXSID10939458
- InChI: InChI=1S/C6H7N.2ClH.H3N.Pt/c1-6-4-2-3-5-7-6;;;;/h2-5H,1H3;2*1H;1H3;/q;;;;+2/p-2 Key: IIMIOEBMYPRQGU-UHFFFAOYSA-L; InChI=1/C6H7N.2ClH.H3N.Pt/c1-6-4-2-3-5-7-6;;;;/h2-5H,1H3;2*1H;1H3;/q;;;;+2/p-2 Key: IIMIOEBMYPRQGU-NUQVWONBAG
- SMILES: ionic form: Cc1ccccn1.N.[Cl-].[Cl-].[Pt+2]; coordination form: Cl[Pt-2](Cl)([NH3+])[n+]1ccccc1C

Properties
Chemical formula	C_{6}H_{10}Cl_{2}N_{2}Pt
Molar mass	376.14 g·mol^{−1}
- Except where otherwise noted, data are given for materials in their standard state (at 25 °C [77 °F], 100 kPa). verify (what is ?) Infobox references

Picoplatin is a platinum-based antineoplastic agent in clinical development by Poniard Pharmaceuticals (previously NeoRx) for the treatment of patients with solid tumors.

In Phase I and Phase II clinical trials, picoplatin demonstrated activity in a variety of solid tumors, including lung, ovarian, colorectal and hormone-refractory prostate cancer. However, in Phase III trials, picoplatin failed to hit its primary endpoint for advanced small cell lung cancer. Hopes are now pinned on its use for metastatic colorectal cancer.
