= Discovery and Configuration Protocol =

The Discovery and Basic Configuration Protocol (DCP) is a protocol definition within the PROFINET context. It is a link layer based protocol to configure station names and IP addresses. It is restricted to the local network segment and mainly used in small and medium applications without an installed DHCP server.
