= Dicycloplatin =

Chemical compound

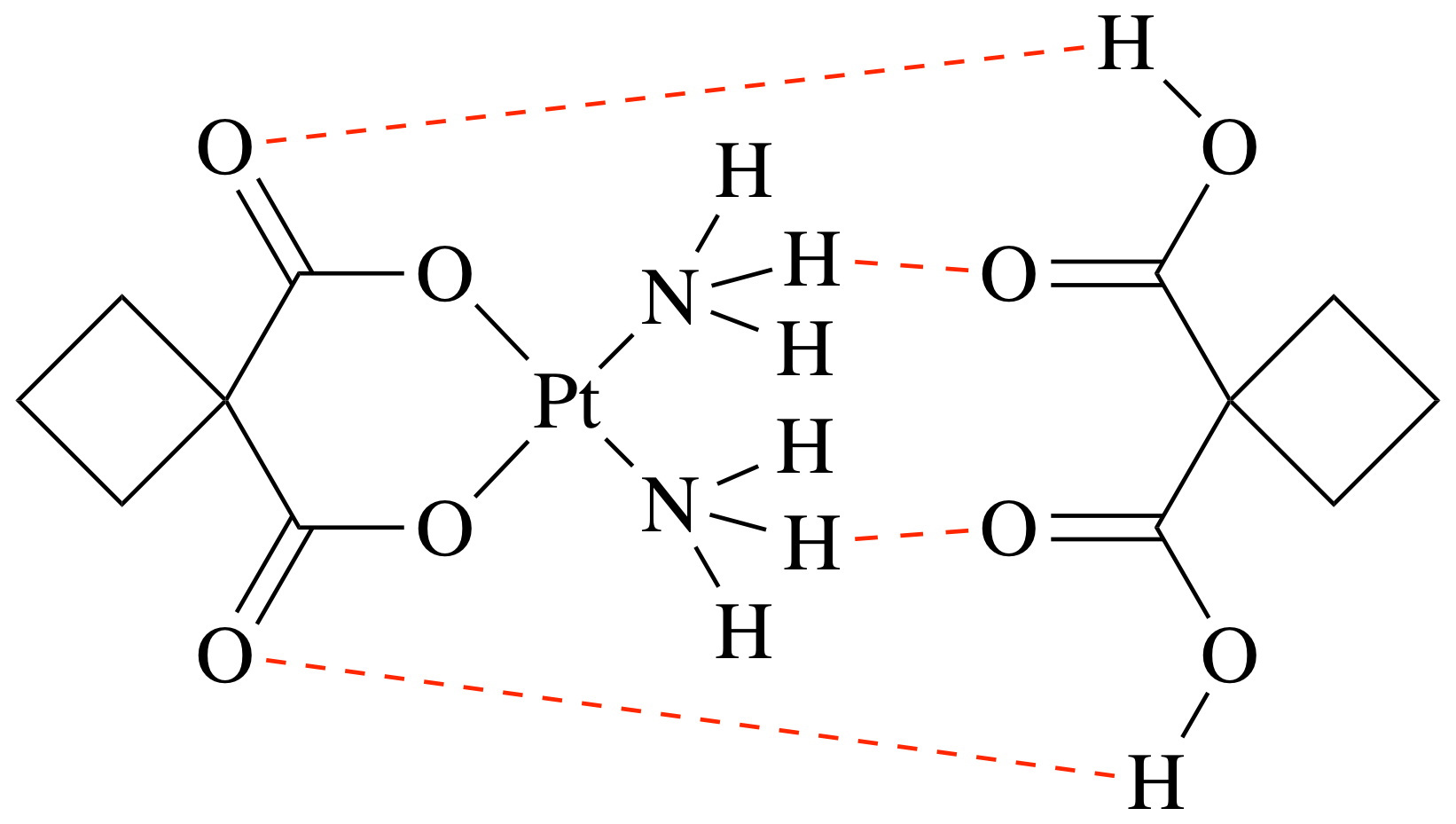
- Chemical structure of Dicycloplatin

Clinical data
- Trade names: Dicycloplatin
- Other names: Platinum(2+) 1-carboxycyclobutanecarboxylate ammoniate (1:2:2), 1,1-Cyclobutanedicarboxylic acid, compd. with (sp-4-2)-diammine(1,1-cyclobutanedi(carboxylato-kappaO)(2-))platinum (1:1)
- Routes of administration: Intravenous

Pharmacokinetic data
- Bioavailability: 100% (IV)
- Protein binding: < 88.7%
- Elimination half-life: 24.49 - 108.93 hours
- Excretion: Renal

Identifiers
- IUPAC name: azane;cyclobutane-1,1-dicarboxylate;cyclobutane-1,1-dicarboxylic acid;platinum(2+)
- CAS Number: 287402-09-9
- ChemSpider: 8476840
- UNII: 0KC57I4UNB

Chemical and physical data
- Formula: C_{12}H_{20}N_{2}O_{8}Pt
- Molar mass: 515.382 g·mol^{−1}
- 3D model (JSmol): Interactive image; coordination form: Interactive image
- SMILES: C1CC(C1)(C(=O)O)C(=O)O.C1CC(C1)(C(=O)[O-])C(=O)[O-].N.N.[Pt+2]; coordination form: C0CCC0C4[C-]1O[H+]O[C-](O[H+][NH2+]2)C0(CCC0)[C-](O[H+][NH2+]3)O[H+]O[C-]4O[Pt-2]23O1
- InChI: InChI=InChI=1S/2C6H8O4.2H3N.Pt/c2*7-4(8)6(5(9)10)2-1-3-6;;;/h2*1-3H2,(H,7,8)(H,9,10);2*1H3;/q;;;;+2/p-2; Key:IIJQICKYWPGJDT-UHFFFAOYSA-L

Dicycloplatin is a chemotherapy medication used to treat a number of cancers which includes the non-small-cell lung carcinoma and prostate cancer.

Some side effects which are observed from the treatment by dicycloplatin are nausea, vomiting, thrombocytopenia, neutropenia, anemia, fatigue, loss of appetite, liver enzyme elevation and alopecia. The drug is a platinum-based antineoplastic, and it works by causing mitochondrial dysfunction which leads to cell death.

Dicycloplatin was developed in China and it was used for phase I human trial clinical in 2006. The drug was approved for chemotherapy by the Chinese FDA in 2012.

== Medical uses ==
Dicycloplatin can inhibit the proliferation of tumor cells via the induction of apoptosis. It is used to treat a number types of cancer which are non-small-cell lung carcinoma and prostate cancer.

== Side effects ==
Similar to cisplatin and carboplatin, dicycloplatin also contains some side effects, which are nausea, vomiting, thrombocytopenia, neutropenia, anemia, fatigue, loss of appetite, liver enzyme elevation, and alopecia. However, with doses up to 350 mg/m(2), there is no significant toxicity; these effects are observed only at higher doses. Furthermore, the nephrotoxicity of dicycloplatin is reported to be less than that of cisplatin, and its myelosuppressive potency is similar to that of carboplatin.

== Chemical structure ==
Dicycloplatin consists of carboplatin and cyclobutane-1,1-dicarboxylic acid (CBDC) linked by the hydrogen bond. In the structure of dicycloplatin, there are two types of bond: O-H...O is the bond between the hydroxyl group of CBDC with carboxyl oxygen atom. It creates the one-dimensional polymer chain of carboplatin and CBDC. The second one is N-H...O which links between the ammonia group of carboplatin and oxygen of CBDC. It forms the two-dimensional polymer chain of carboplatin and CBDC. In aqueous solution, the 2D-hydrogen bonded polymeric structure of dicycloplatin is destroyed. Firstly, the bond between ammonia group of carboplatin and oxygen of CBDC breaks, thus inducing the formation of one-dimensional dicycloplatin. After that, the strong hydrogen bond breaks and creates an intermediate state of dicycloplatin. Finally, the rearrangement of different orientation of carboplatin and CBDC leads to the formation of intramolecular hydrogen bond and a supramolecule of dicycloplatin with two O-H...O and N-H...O is created.

== Mechanism of action ==
Similar to carboplatin, dicycloplatin inhibits the proliferation of cancer cells by inducing cell apoptosis. When treated with dicycloplatin, some changes in the properties of Hep G2 cells are observed: the declination of Mitochondria Membrane Potential, the release of cytochrome c from mitochondria to cytosol, the activation of caspase-9, caspase-3 and the decrease of Bcl-2. Those phenomena indicate the role of mitochondrial in the apoptosis by intrinsic way. Furthermore, the increase in caspase-8 activation is also observed. This can stimulate the apoptosis by activating downstream caspase-3 or by cleaving Bid. As a result, the cleavage of Bid (tBid) transfers to the mitochondria and induce mitochondrial dysfunction which promotes the release of cytochrome c from mitochondria to cytosol. From the dicycloplatin-treated Hep G2 cell, an excessive amount of reactive oxygen species was detected, which plays an important role in the release of cytochrome c. In the mitochondria, the release of hemoprotein happens through 2-step process: Firstly, the dissociation of cytochrome c from its binding to cardiolipin happens. Due to the reactive oxygen species, the cardiolipin is oxidized, thus reducing the cytochrome c binding and increase the concentration of free cytochrome c.
