= Democratic Center Party =

Democratic Center Party may refer to:

- Democratic Center Party of Latvia
- Democratic Center Party of Mexico
- Democratic Centre (Colombia)
