= Lipoplatin =

Nanoparticle

Lipoplatin (Liposomal cisplatin) is a nanoparticle of 110 nm average diameter composed of lipids and cisplatin. This new drug has successfully finished Phase I, Phase II, and Phase III human clinical trials. It has shown superiority to cisplatin in combination with paclitaxel as a chemotherapy regimen in non-small cell lung cancer (NSCLC) adenocarcinomas.

== Mechanism of action ==
Lipoplatin evades immune surveillance thus escaping clearance from macrophages, circulates for long periods in body fluids after intravenous administration with a half-life of ~120 h, and extravasates through the compromised endothelium of the vasculature in tumors created during the process of neoangiogenesis Extravasation Figure. Thus, lipoplatin nanoparticles are concentrated to the primary tumor and metastases. Human studies have shown 40- to 200-fold higher platinum concentration compared to the adjacent normal tissue in specimens from human biopsies 20 post-infusion of the drug. Lipoplatin nanoparticles once inside the tumor cell mass can fuse with the cell membrane because of the presence of the fusogenic lipid DPPG in their lipid bilayer; an alternative mechanism proposed is that lipoplatin is taken by endocytosis by tumor cells as shown from lipoplatin containing fluorescent lipids and imaging of the tumor cells in culture thus treated with fluorescent microscopy. These processes occurring at the cell membrane level are promoted by the lipid shell of the nanoparticles (disguised as nutrients). The technology allows lipoplatin to empty its toxic payload (cisplatin) inside the cytoplasm to kill the tumor cell. The cell membrane is considered a significant barrier to transportation of the toxic molecules of cisplatin across and inside the tumor cell.

== Trials ==
The European Medicines Agency (EMEA) gave lipoplatin orphan drug status in 2007 in an ongoing registrational Phase II/III study as a first line-treatment in pancreatic cancer. Under the trade name Nanoplatin, lipoplatin received EMEA consent in 2009 to be tested as a first-line treatment for non-squamous cell non-small-cell lung cancers (ns-NSCLC) that are mainly composed of adenocarcinomas. The results of a Phase III trial were published in October 2011. This study used lipoplatin in combination with paclitaxel to treat ns-NSCLC, comparing response rates and toxicities to a similar group of patients treated with cisplatin plus paclitaxel and demonstrated a statistically significant (‘’p’’-value = 0.036) increase in tumor response rate in the lipoplatin arm (59.22% of patients) versus the cisplatin arm (42.42% of patients). Most major toxicities of cisplatin, especially nephrotoxicity, were also reduced in the group of patients treated with lipoplatin and treatment did not require hospitalisation for lipoplatin patients. Median survival times were 10 months for the lipoplatin arm and 8 months for the cisplatin arm, with a ‘’p’’-value of 0.155. The median duration of response was 7 months for the lipoplatin arm and 6 months for the cisplatin arm. Although not statistically significant, these results suggest the potential for superior overall survival for lipoplatin compared to cisplatin, a hypothesis that is being tested in a larger trial. Furthermore, among the responders to lipoplatin a subgroup of patients demonstrated a substantially higher overall survival than a comparable subgroup of cisplatin responders. After 10 months, 30% of patients in the lipoplatin arm, as compared with just 16% of patients in the cisplatin arm, were without disease progression. By the end of the trial, there were 32 patients alive, 21 from the lipoplatin arm (20.39%) and 11 from the cisplatin arm (11.11%). Thus, after 18 months, the number of surviving patients was approximately double for lipoplatin versus cisplatin. The clinical development of lipoplatin in adenocarcinomas establishes this drug as the most active platinum drug with significantly lower side effects.

Preliminary investigations suggest the potential for lipoplatin to be a suitable agent for targeting ovarian cancer in patients with aggressive cisplatin resistance.

== Sources ==
- Boulikas T (2004) Low toxicity and anticancer activity of a novel liposomal cisplatin (Lipoplatin) in mouse xenografts. Oncol Rep 12: 3-12, 2004.
