= Nedaplatin =

Chemical compound

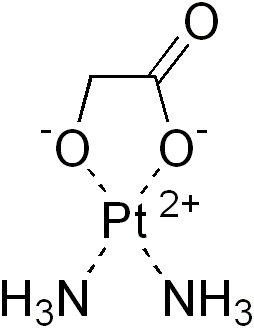

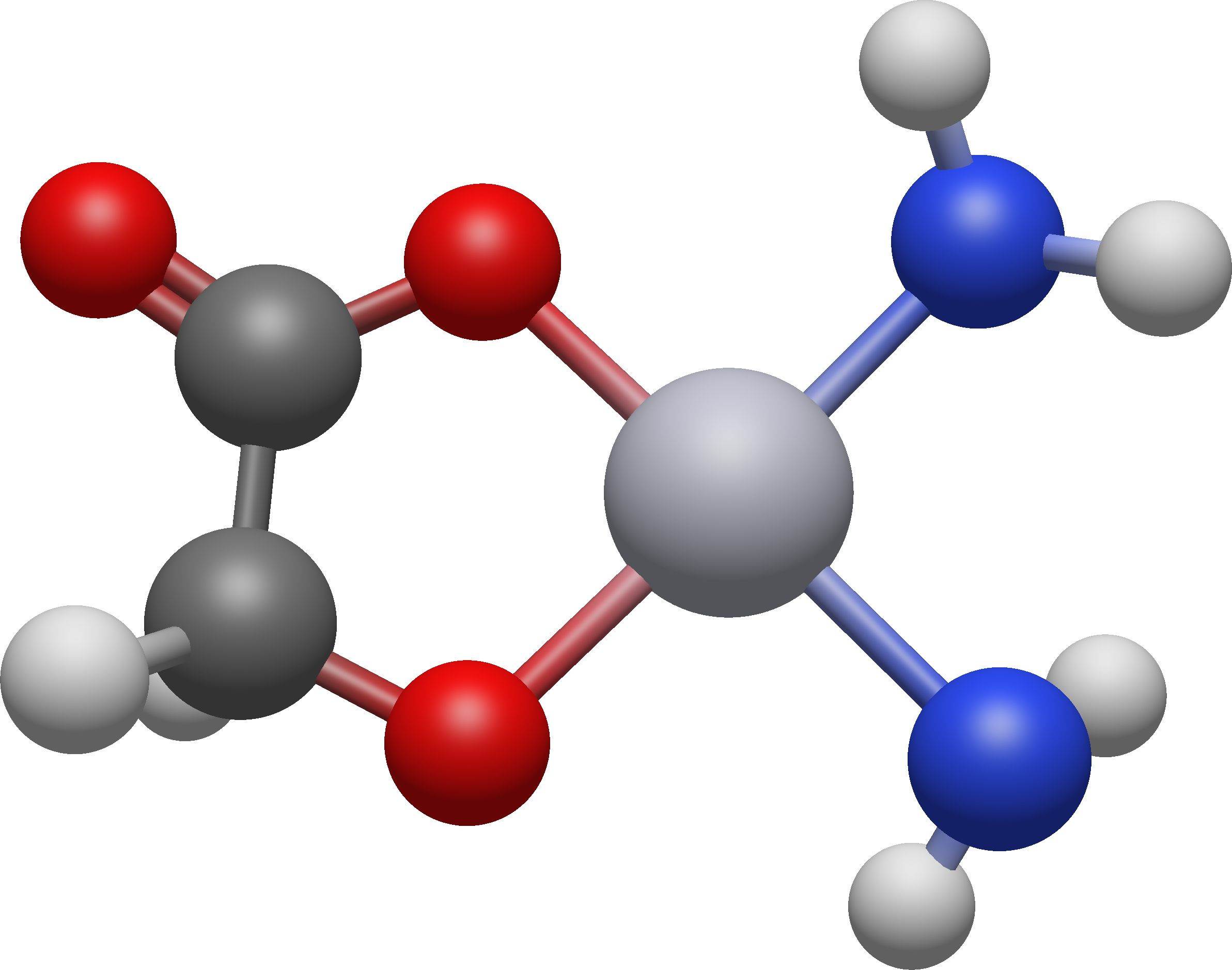

Clinical data
- AHFS/Drugs.com: International Drug Names
- Routes of administration: Intravenous therapy
- ATC code: None

Legal status
- Legal status: In general: ℞ (Prescription only)

Identifiers
- IUPAC name: Diammine[(hydroxy-κO)acetato(2-)-κO]platinum
- CAS Number: 95734-82-0
- PubChem CID: 9796440
- ChemSpider: 7972206
- UNII: 8UQ3W6JXAN
- KEGG: D01416
- CompTox Dashboard (EPA): DTXSID8046878

Chemical and physical data
- Formula: C_{2}H_{8}N_{2}O_{3}Pt
- Molar mass: 303.181 g·mol^{−1}
- 3D model (JSmol): Interactive image; coordination form: Interactive image
- SMILES: C(C(=O)[O-])[O-].N.N.[Pt+2]; coordination form: O=C1O[Pt-2]([NH3+])([NH3+])OC1
- InChI: InChI=1S/C2H3O3.2H3N.Pt/c3-1-2(4)5;;;/h1H2,(H,4,5);2*1H3;/q-1;;;+2/p-1; Key:GYAVMUDJCHAASE-UHFFFAOYSA-M

Nedaplatin, sold in Japan as Aqupla (see External Links), is a platinum-based chemotherapy agent. It is toxic to DNA, causing damage to DNA, limiting DNA repair and ultimately limiting DNA synthesis, limiting the propagation of cancer cells.

== Medical uses ==
Nedaplatin can be prescribed to patients with the following types of cancer:

- small/non-small cell lung cancer
- oesophageal cancer
- uterine cervical cancer
- urothelial cancer
- testicular cancer
- ovarian cancer
- prostate cancer
- head and neck cancer

Nedaplatin is most often compared to other platinum-based drugs, most notably cisplatin. Many randomized controlled trials have been performed to compare nedaplatin and cisplatin, with uncertain results.

One meta-analysis of 14 trials indicated no difference in efficacy in terms of median overall survival. Another meta-analysis of 17 trials looking specifically at concurrent chemoradiotherapy treatment for cervical cancer also found no difference in 3 year all-cause mortality, but did favour nedaplatin for 1 year all-cause mortality.

=== Available forms ===
Nedaplatin comes as a powder, since it is unstable in a solution. For clinical administration, it is dissolved in a liquid and administered intravenously.

== Adverse effects ==
- Nephrotoxicity: Like cisplatin, nephrotoxicity, harm to the kidneys, is the primary dose-limiting factor. However, the nephrotoxicity of nedaplatin has been shown to be less severe than cisplatin. In rats, nedaplatin primarily affected the renal papilla, with papillary necrosis in severe cases.
- Neurotoxicity: Nedaplatin is widely reported to be neurotoxic, especially to the nerves of the ear. Causing symptoms like numbness and tingling in mild cases, or sensory ataxia in more severe cases.
- Nausea and vomiting: The emetogenic effects of nedaplatin are commonly managed with prophylactic antiemetics, such as duplex dexamethasone and ondansetron or triplex dexamethasone, ondansetron and aprepitant.
- Ototoxicity: Nedaplatin is toxic to the nerve and hair cells in the cochlea. In rats, nedaplatin was severely toxic to the nerve cells at a concentration of 10 μM, with damage to hair cells becoming more severe exceeding 100 μM.
- Neutropenia, leukopenia, anemia and thrombocytopenia (see "Aqupla アクプラ" in External Links): Nedaplatin is toxic to the hemopoietic cells of the bone marrow, combined with reduced levels of erythropoietin, leads to elevated incidence of bone marrow suppression compared to cisplatin. Incidence of severe grades of leukopenia and neutropenia are reported to be higher than cisplatin in treatment combined with radiotherapy. These haematological adverse effects are common in general.

== Toxicity ==
The recommended therapeutic dose is 80-100 mg/m^{2} body area. Optimal dosage is determined based on measurements of unbound platinum concentration following intravenous infusion, combined with rate of creatine clearance as an assessment of renal function using Ishibashi’s formula:

Dose_{NDP} = AUC × CL_{NDP}, where CL_{NDP} = 0.0738 × creatinine clearance + 4.47

The exact mechanism of uptake into the cell is unknown, with information being considerably less available compared to cisplatin. What is known is that nedaplatin does not interact with the Oct2 or apical multidrug and toxin extrusion transporter (MATE) transporters, potentially explaining the difference in nephrotoxicity due to reduced accumulation in the proximal tubules of the kidney. Toxicogenomics has helped elucidate some of the mechanisms behind nephrotoxicity, where oxidative stress has been shown to deregulate gene expression via Hmox1 and other genes.

== Pharmacology ==
=== Mechanism of action ===
Disruption of the DNA structure caused by the crosslinksobstructs the DNA polymerases, preventing DNA replication and transcription. This causes the cell to go into cell cycle arrest it cannot go on from the G2 to the M phase and stops at the G2/M checkpoint. The cell tries to repair the DNA before dividing.

The intrastrand crosslinks are normally repaired by the excision repair pathway. It attempts to remove the platinum adducts. If repair fails or is insufficient, apoptosis is induced and leads to cell death. However, cancer cells have impaired apoptosis pathways limited DNA repair pathways. This can decrease the efficacy of the drug and can lead to resistance to the drug.

It has been observed that radiotherapy pairs well with administration with the drug, but how this works is not entirely established. It is known that cells that cells that are stuck at the G2/M phase of the cell cycle and have impaired DNA repair system are more sensitive to radiotherapy. This suggests that nedaplatin is a radiosensitizer,

=== Pharmacokinetics ===
Nedaplatin is administered in its active form and is removed from the bloodstream by the kidneys to leave the body via the urine.

The recommended therapeutic dose of nedaplatin is 80–100 mg/m^{2} of body surface area. Optimal dosing is determined using measurements of unbound platinum concentrations following intravenous infusion together with an assessment of renal function using creatinine clearance. The dose can be estimated using Ishibashi’s formula: Dose_{NDP} = AUC × CL_{NDP}, where CL_{NDP} = 0.0738 × creatinine clearance + 4.47 The precise mechanism of cellular uptake is not fully understood, and substantially less information is available compared with cisplatin. However, nedaplatin does not interact with the Oct2 transporter or apical multidrug and toxin extrusion (MATE) transporters, which may contribute to its lower accumulation in renal proximal tubules.

== Chemistry ==
=== Structure ===
Like most Platinum-based anti cancer drugs, nedaplatin is a square planar platinum(II) complex. It contains two leaving groups in the form of the glycolate and two mutually cis amines.

=== Reactivity ===
Activation of platinum drugs occurs through displacement of the leaving groups by water molecules. In nedaplatin, the glycolate ligand leaves the complex through two consecutive aquation reactions, in which water hydrolyses the ligand and sequentially replaces it. In this activated state, nedaplatin becomes highly electrophilic and readily forms stable complexes with soft nucleophiles. The active species reacts with nucleobases within DNA, preferentially at guanine and, less frequently, adenine. It primarily forms intrastrand crosslinks, including 1,2-adducts between adjacent guanines and 1,3-adducts between guanines separated by a single nucleotide residue, bending the DNA helix and disrupting its structure. Formation of the active species depends on the rate of hydrolysis, which is influenced by the identity of the leaving ligand. The glycolate ligand hydrolyses relatively readily under physiological conditions, producing the active species at a comparatively uniform rate throughout the body. This differs from cisplatin, whose chloride leaving groups hydrolyse more rapidly in low-chloride environments. Although nedaplatin has a high affinity for nucleobases, it can also bind other soft nucleophiles, including purine alkaloids and sulfur-containing proteins. Binding to these non-target biomolecules can reduce its interaction with DNA, thereby diminishing its anti-cancer activity.

=== Synthesis ===
Nedaplatin is synthesized from platinum(II) tetraiodide [PtI_{4}]^{2−} by treatment with silver nitrate, followed by reaction with a glycolate salt to form the final complex.

== History ==
Nedaplatin was developed in 1983 by Shionogi Pharmaceutical Company, as an alternative to cisplatin. It was first approved for use in Japan in 1995. Cisplatin was found to cause acute renal failure in approximately one third of subjects. Nedaplatin was found to cause less nephrotoxicity and gastrointestinal toxicity when compared to cisplatin, although still moderately present, yet it was proven to have the same effectivity. As renal toxicity is a severe limiting factor in clinical use, nedaplatin is already a better alternative to Cisplatin. Despite this, Japan is the only country with full clinical legislation of nedaplatin as of 2016.
