= Oxaliplatin =

Pharmaceutical drug

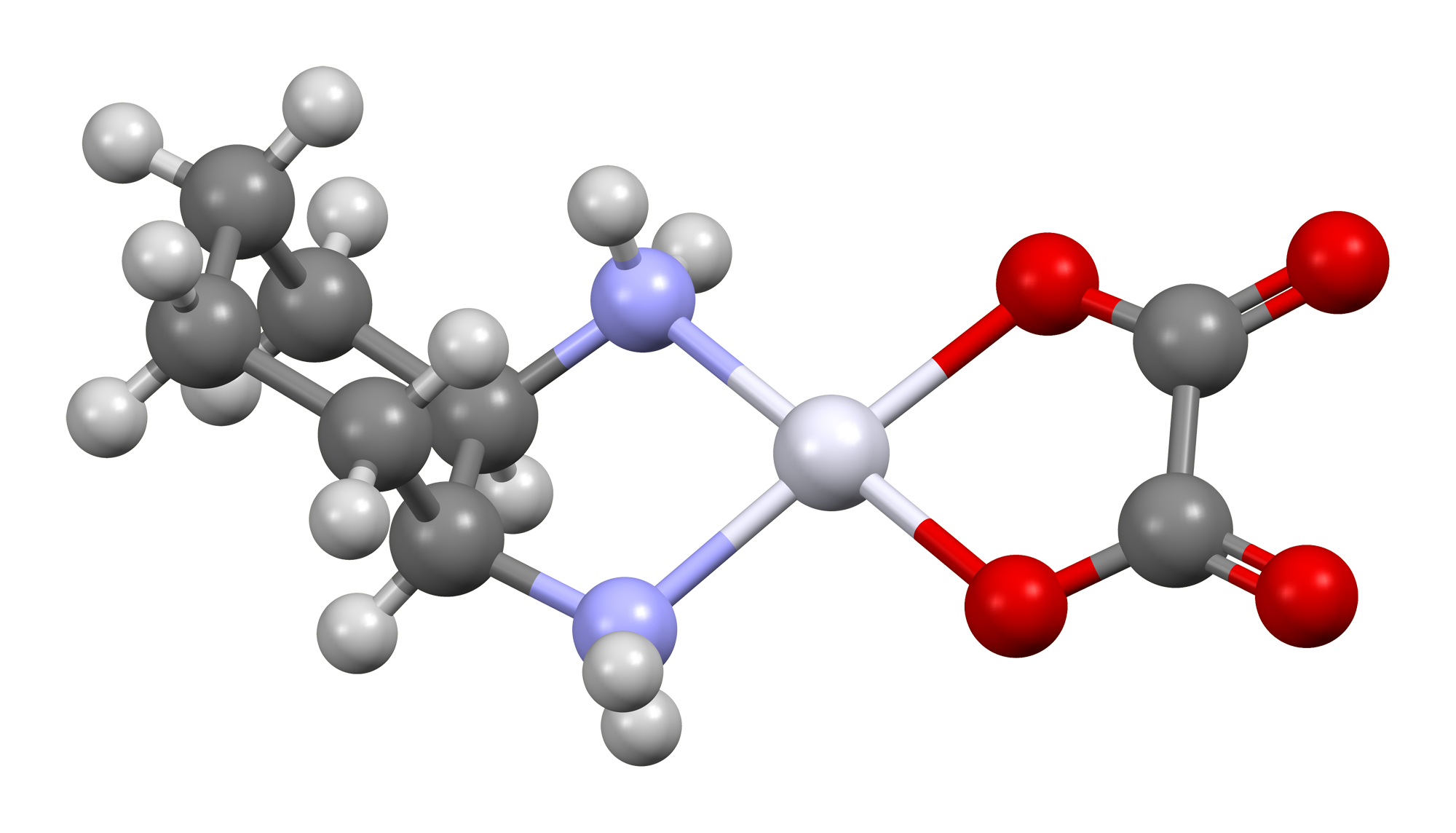

Clinical data
- Trade names: Eloxatin
- AHFS/Drugs.com: Monograph
- MedlinePlus: a607035
- License data: US DailyMed: Oxaliplatin
- Routes of administration: Intravenous
- ATC code: L01XA03 (WHO)

Legal status
- Legal status: AU: S4 (Prescription only); US: ℞-only

Pharmacokinetic data
- Bioavailability: Complete
- Elimination half-life: ~10 – 25 minutes
- Excretion: Kidney

Identifiers
- IUPAC name: [(1R,2R)-cyclohexane-1,2-diamine](ethanedioato-O,O')platinum(II)
- CAS Number: 61825-94-3
- PubChem CID: 77994
- DrugBank: DB00526
- ChemSpider: 8062727
- UNII: 04ZR38536J
- KEGG: D01790
- ChEMBL: ChEMBL414804
- PDB ligand: 1PT (PDBe, RCSB PDB)
- CompTox Dashboard (EPA): DTXSID701125309 DTXSID0036760, DTXSID701125309
- ECHA InfoCard: 100.150.118

Chemical and physical data
- Formula: C_{8}H_{14}N_{2}O_{4}Pt
- Molar mass: 397.294 g·mol^{−1}
- 3D model (JSmol): Interactive image
- SMILES: O1C(=O)C(=O)O[Pt-2]12[NH2+]C0CCCCC0[NH2+]2

Oxaliplatin, sold under the brand name Eloxatin among others, is a cancer medication (platinum-based antineoplastic class) used to treat colorectal cancer. It is given by infusion into a vein.

Common side effects include numbness, feeling tired, nausea, diarrhea, and low blood cell counts. Other serious side effects include allergic reactions. Use in pregnancy is known to harm the baby. Oxaliplatin is in the platinum-based antineoplastic family of medications. It is believed to work by blocking the duplication of DNA.

Oxaliplatin was patented in 1976 in Japan and approved for medical use in 1996 in Europe. It is on the 2023 World Health Organization's List of Essential Medicines.

== Medical uses ==
Oxaliplatin is used for treatment of colorectal cancer, typically along with folinic acid (leucovorin) and fluorouracil in a combination known as FOLFOX or along with capecitabine in a combination known as CAPOX or XELOX. It also has uses in pancreatic cancer and stomach cancer or esophageal cancer. It may also be effective against breast cancer, germ cell tumor, ovarian cancer and non-small-cell lung cancer.

=== Advanced colorectal cancer ===
Oxaliplatin by itself has modest activity against advanced colorectal cancer. When compared with just 5-fluorouracil and folinic acid administered according to the de Gramont regimen, a FOLFOX4 regime produced no significant increase in overall survival, but did produce an improvement in progression-free survival, the primary end-point of the phase III randomized trial.

== Adverse effects ==
Side-effects of oxaliplatin treatment can potentially include:

- Neurotoxicity leading to chemotherapy-induced peripheral neuropathy, a progressive, enduring and often irreversible tingling numbness, intense pain and hypersensitivity to cold, beginning in the hands and feet and sometimes involving the arms and legs, often with deficits in proprioception. This chronic neuropathy may also be preceded by a transient acute neuropathy occurring at the time of infusion and associated with excitation of voltage-gated Na^{+} channels.
- Fatigue
- Nausea, vomiting, or diarrhea
- Neutropenia (low number of a type of white blood cells)
- Ototoxicity (hearing loss)
- Extravasation if oxaliplatin leaks from the infusion vein it may cause severe damage to the connective tissues.
- Hypokalemia (low blood potassium), which is more common in women than men
- Persistent hiccups
- Rhabdomyolysis

In addition, some patients may experience an allergic reaction to platinum-containing drugs. This is more common in women.

Oxaliplatin has less ototoxicity and nephrotoxicity than cisplatin and carboplatin.

== Structure and mechanism ==
The compound features a square planar platinum(II) center. In contrast to other drugs of the platinum-based antineoplastic class of drugs cisplatin and carboplatin, oxaliplatin features the bidentate ligand trans-1,2-diaminocyclohexane in place of the two monodentate ammine ligands. It also features a bidentate oxalate group. The three-dimensional structure of the molecule has been elucidated by X-ray crystallography, although the presence of pseudosymmetry in the crystal structure has caused confusion in its interpretation.

According to in vivo studies, oxaliplatin fights carcinoma of the colon through non-targeted cytotoxic effects. Like other platinum compounds, its cytotoxicity is thought to result from inhibition of DNA synthesis in cells. In particular, oxaliplatin forms both inter- and intra-strand cross links in DNA, which prevent DNA replication and transcription, causing cell death.

== History ==
Oxaliplatin was first synthesized in 1978 at Nagoya City University by Yoshinori Kidani. It was later developed in Europe as a less toxic and more effective alternative to cisplatin. It gained European approval in 1996, and approval by the U.S. Food and Drug Administration in 2002. Generic oxaliplatin was first approved in the United States in August 2009. Patent disputes caused generic production to stop in 2010, but it restarted in 2012.

== Patent information ==
Eloxatin was covered by patent numbers 5338874 (expired 7 April 2013), 5420319 (expired 8 August 2016), 5716988 (expired 7 August 2015) and 5290961 (expired 12 January 2013) (see Electronic Orange Book patent info for Eloxatin). Exclusivity code I-441, which expired on 4 November 2007, is for use combination with infusional 5-FU/LV for adjuvant treatment stage III colon cancer patients who have undergone complete resection primary tumor-based on improvement in disease free survival with no demonstrated benefit overall survival after 4 years. Exclusivity code NCE, New Chemical Entity, expired on 9 August 2007.
